

5001–5100 

|-
| 5001 EMP ||  || The annual publication Ephemerides Of Minor Planets. It contains astrometric information about minor planets || 
|-id=002
| 5002 Marnix ||  || Philips Marnix van Sint Aldegonde (1538–1598), mayor of Antwerp, believed to have been the composer of the 'Wilhelmus', which became the Dutch national anthem in 1932 || 
|-id=003
| 5003 Silvanominuto ||  || Silvano Minuto (born 1940), Italian amateur astronomer, founder of the Suno Observatory and promoter of several regional laws on light pollution || 
|-id=004
| 5004 Bruch ||  || Max Bruch (1838–1920), German composer || 
|-id=005
| 5005 Kegler || 1988 UB || Ignatius Kegler (1680–1746), a German Jesuit and Astronomer Royal in Beijing || 
|-id=006
| 5006 Teller ||  || Edward Teller (1908–2003), Hungarian-born American physicist || 
|-id=007
| 5007 Keay ||  || Colin Stewart Lindsay Keay (born 1930), Australian physicist and astronomer past president of IAU Commission 22 and chairman of the IAU Working Group on the Prevention of Interplanetary Pollution || 
|-id=008
| 5008 Miyazawakenji || 1991 DV || Kenji Miyazawa, Japanese poet and children's novelist || 
|-id=009
| 5009 Sethos || 2562 P-L || Sethos I, an Egyptian pharaoh of the Nineteenth Dynasty || 
|-id=010
| 5010 Amenemhêt || 4594 P-L || Amenemhět III (1844–1797 B.C.), an Egyptian pharaoh of the Twelfth Dynasty || 
|-id=011
| 5011 Ptah || 6743 P-L || Ptah, Egyptian god || 
|-id=012
| 5012 Eurymedon || 9507 P-L || Eurymedon, charioteer of Agamemnon and servant of Nestor in the Trojan War || 
|-id=013
| 5013 Suzhousanzhong ||  || Suzhousanzhong ("Suzhou No. 3 Middle School"), Jiangsu province, China, on the occasion (2006) of its 100th anniversary || 
|-id=014
| 5014 Gorchakov || 1974 ST || Prince Alexander Gorchakov (1798–1883), chancellor of the Russian Empire || 
|-id=015
| 5015 Litke || 1975 VP || Count Fyodor Litke (1797–1882), Russian navigator and explorer || 
|-id=016
| 5016 Migirenko ||  || Georgij Sergeeveich Migirenko (born 1916), Russian physicist || 
|-id=017
| 5017 Tenchi ||  || Emperor Tenji (626–671), Japan || 
|-id=018
| 5018 Tenmu ||  || Emperor Temmu (c. 631–686), Japan || 
|-id=019
| 5019 Erfjord ||  || Erfjord, village in Norway || 
|-id=020
| 5020 Asimov ||  || Isaac Asimov (1920–1992), Russian-American science fiction writer || 
|-id=021
| 5021 Krylania ||  || Anna Kapitsa (born 1903) née Krylova, daughter of mathematician Aleksey Krylov and wife of physicist Pyotr Kapitsa || 
|-id=022
| 5022 Roccapalumba ||  || Roccapalumba, a village in Sicily, Italy || 
|-id=023
| 5023 Agapenor ||  || Agapenor, mythical person related to Trojan War || 
|-id=024
| 5024 Bechmann || 1985 VP || Poul Bechmann is the former head of the mechanical workshop at the Brorfelde Observatory, Denmark || 
|-id=025
| 5025 Mecisteus ||  || Mecisteus from Greek mythology, who carried the wounded Teucer and Hypsenor off the battlefield. Mecisteus and his father Echius were killed by Polydamas while defending the Greek ships. || 
|-id=026
| 5026 Martes ||  || Animal species pine marten (Martes martes) and beech marten (Martes foina) living on Klet Mountain, Czech Republic, where the Klet Observatory is located || 
|-id=027
| 5027 Androgeos ||  || Androgeos, mythical person related to Trojan War || 
|-id=028
| 5028 Halaesus ||  || Halaesus, mythological Greek warrior || 
|-id=029
| 5029 Ireland ||  || Named for the country of Ireland || 
|-id=030
| 5030 Gyldenkerne ||  || Kjeld Gyldenkerne (1919–1999), Danish astronomer || 
|-id=031
| 5031 Švejcar ||  || Josef Švejcar (1897–19XX), Czech physician || 
|-id=032
| 5032 Conradhirsh || 1990 OO || Conrad W. Hirsh (1941–1999), teacher and explorer || 
|-id=033
| 5033 Mistral || 1990 PF || Frédéric Mistral (1830–1914), French writer and Nobel Prize laureate || 
|-id=034
| 5034 Joeharrington ||  || Joseph Harrington (born 1967), American planetary scientist at Cornell University, New York || 
|-id=035
| 5035 Swift || 1991 UX || Lewis A. Swift (1820–1913), American astronomer and comet hunter || 
|-id=036
| 5036 Tuttle ||  || Horace P. Tuttle (1837–1923), American astronomer and American Civil War veteran || 
|-id=037
| 5037 Habing || 6552 P-L || Harm Jan Habing (born 1937), Dutch astronomer and professor at Leiden University || 
|-id=038
| 5038 Overbeek || 1948 KF || Daniel Overbeek (born 1920), South African amateur astronomer and past president of ASSA || 
|-id=039
| 5039 Rosenkavalier ||  || Richard Strauss (1864–1949), German composer of opera, notably Der Rosenkavalier (The Knight of the Rose) || 
|-id=040
| 5040 Rabinowitz || 1972 RF || David Rabinowitz, American astronomer at Spacewatch and a discoverer of minor planets himself || 
|-id=041
| 5041 Theotes ||  || Theotes, mythical person related to Trojan War || 
|-id=042
| 5042 Colpa || 1974 ME || "Colpa", the Huarpe word for stones that are composed of "pure minerals". These indigenous people lived in San Juan province of Argentina, where the discovering Félix Aguilar Observatory is located || 
|-id=043
| 5043 Zadornov ||  || Mikhail Zadornov, Russian comedian † || 
|-id=044
| 5044 Shestaka ||  || Ivan Sofronovich Shestaka (1937–1994), chief researcher of comets and meteors at the astronomical observatory of Odessa University, Russia || 
|-id=045
| 5045 Hoyin ||  || Yin Ho (1908–1983), Chinese philanthropist from Macau || 
|-id=046
| 5046 Carletonmoore || 1981 DQ || Carleton Bryant Moore (born 1932) professor of chemistry and geology of the Center for Meteorite Studies at Arizona State University || 
|-id=047
| 5047 Zanda ||  || Brigitte Zanda (born 1958), a meteorite curator at the Muséum National d´Histoire Naturelle de Paris and an adjunct faculty member at Rutgers University || 
|-id=048
| 5048 Moriarty || 1981 GC || Professor Moriarty, character in the Sherlock Holmes stories || 
|-id=049
| 5049 Sherlock ||  || Sherlock Holmes, fictional detective || 
|-id=050
| 5050 Doctorwatson ||  || Dr. Watson, character in the Sherlock Holmes stories || 
|-id=051
| 5051 Ralph || 1984 SM || Ralph Florentin Nielsen (1942–1995) was head of the electronics laboratory at the Brorfelde Observatory, Denmark || 
|-id=052
| 5052 Nancyruth ||  || Nancy R. Lebofsky, American educator || 
|-id=053
| 5053 Chladni ||  || Ernst Chladni (1756–1827), German physicist and musician || 
|-id=054
| 5054 Keil ||  || Klaus Keil (born 1934), American meteoriticist at University of Hawaii Institute of Geophysics and Planetology || 
|-id=055
| 5055 Opekushin ||  || Aleksandr Mikhailovich Opekushin (1838–1923), Russian sculptor || 
|-id=056
| 5056 Rahua ||  || Rahua, wife of one of the four sons of Pirua Wiracocha, creator god of civilization in Inca mythology || 
|-id=057
| 5057 Weeks ||  || Eric R. Weeks (born 1970), a Professor in the Physics Department at Emory University || 
|-id=058
| 5058 Tarrega || 1987 OM || Francisco Tárrega, Spanish classical guitarist-composer || 
|-id=059
| 5059 Saroma || 1988 AF || Lake Saroma, Hokkaido, Japan || 
|-id=060
| 5060 Yoneta ||  || Katsuhiko Yoneta (1904–1957), Japanese engineer and a graduate of Hokkaido University || 
|-id=061
| 5061 McIntosh || 1988 DJ || Bruce A. McIntosh, Canadian astronomer || 
|-id=062
| 5062 Glennmiller || 1989 CZ || Glenn Miller, American jazz musician and bandleader of the swing era || 
|-id=063
| 5063 Monteverdi ||  || Claudio Monteverdi (1567–1643), Italian composer and Catholic priest || 
|-id=064
| 5064 Tanchozuru || 1990 FS || Tancho, Japanese crane || 
|-id=065
| 5065 Johnstone ||  || Paul Johnstone (died 1976), the first director and producer of The Sky at Night, a British documentary television programme on astronomy || 
|-id=066
| 5066 Garradd || 1990 MA || Gordon J. Garradd (born 1959), Australian amateur astronomer and photographer || 
|-id=067
| 5067 Occidental || 1990 OX || Occidental College, located in the Eagle Rock neighborhood of Los Angeles, California, United States || 
|-id=068
| 5068 Cragg || 1990 TC || Thomas A. Cragg, an American amateur astronomer || 
|-id=069
| 5069 Tokeidai || 1991 QB || Sapporo Tokeidai, Japan || 
|-id=070
| 5070 Arai || 1991 XT || Arai Ikunosuke, Japanese from Bakumatsu to Meiji || 
|-id=071
| 5071 Schoenmaker || 3099 T-2 || Anton A. Schoenmaker, Dutch technical officer at the Leiden Observatory || 
|-id=072
| 5072 Hioki ||  || Tsutomu Hioki, Japanese astronomer || 
|-id=073
| 5073 Junttura || 1943 EN || "Junttura" embodies the Finnish mentality to get things done, stubbornly and at all costs || 
|-id=074
| 5074 Goetzoertel ||  || Goetz Oertel, American physicist and chairman of AURA || 
|-id=075
| 5075 Goryachev ||  || Nikolaj Nikanorovich Goryachev (1883–1940), Russian professor of astronomy at Tomsk University || 
|-id=076
| 5076 Lebedev-Kumach ||  || Vasily Lebedev-Kumach (1898–1949), Soviet and Russian poet and songwriter || 
|-id=077
| 5077 Favaloro || 1974 MG || René Favaloro, Argentine cardiologist (1923–2000), creator of the bypass coronary surgery || 
|-id=078
| 5078 Solovjev-Sedoj || 1974 SW || Vasilij Pavlovich Solovjev-Sedoj (1907–1979), Russian composer || 
|-id=079
| 5079 Brubeck || 1975 DB || Dave Brubeck (1920–2012), American jazz pianist and composer || 
|-id=080
| 5080 Oja || 1976 EB || Tarmo Oja, Swedish astronomer || 
|-id=081
| 5081 Sanguin ||  || Juan Sanguin (1933–2006) was an Argentinian astronomer who was in charge of the minor planet and comet programs at the El Leoncito Station for more than a quarter of a century || 
|-id=082
| 5082 Nihonsyoki ||  || Nihon Shoki, the first written history of Japan, compiled in the 8th century || 
|-id=083
| 5083 Irinara || 1977 EV || Irina Evgen'evna Raksha, Russian writer and friend of the discoverer Nikolai Chernykh || 
|-id=084
| 5084 Gnedin ||  || Yurij Nikolaevich Gnedin (born 1935), Russian astrophysicist || 
|-id=085
| 5085 Hippocrene || 1977 NN || Hippocrene, mythological Greek fountain || 
|-id=086
| 5086 Demin ||  || Vladimir Grigor'evich Demin (1929–1996), Russian professor at Moscow University and expert on celestial mechanics and dynamics of rigid bodies || 
|-id=087
| 5087 Emelʹyanov ||  || Nikolai Vladimirovich Emelʹyanov (born 1946), Russian astronomer head of the Celestial Mechanics Department of the Sternberg Astronomical Institute in Moscow || 
|-id=088
| 5088 Tancredi ||  || Gonzalo Tancredi, Uruguayan astronomer || 
|-id=089
| 5089 Nádherná || 1979 SN || Sidonie Nádherná (1885–1950), Czech-British writer || 
|-id=090
| 5090 Wyeth || 1980 CG || Stuart Wyeth, American donor of the Wyeth 1.5-meter telescope at Harvard Observatory || 
|-id=091
| 5091 Isakovskij ||  || Mikhail Vasil'evich Isakovskii (1900–1973), Russian poet || 
|-id=092
| 5092 Manara || 1982 FJ || Alessandro Manara, astronomer at Brera Astronomical Observatory in Milan, Italy || 
|-id=093
| 5093 Svirelia ||  || Elsa Gustavovna Sviridova, the wife of Russian composer Georgy Sviridov || 
|-id=094
| 5094 Seryozha ||  || Sergey Kapitsa (1928–2012), Russian physicist || 
|-id=095
| 5095 Escalante || 1983 NL || Jaime Escalante (1930–2010), Bolivian-born mathematics teacher || 
|-id=096
| 5096 Luzin ||  || Nikolai Nikolaevich Luzin, Russian mathematician || 
|-id=097
| 5097 Axford ||  || Ian Axford (1933–2010), New Zealand-born astrophysicist and longtime director of the Max Planck Institute for Solar System Research || 
|-id=098
| 5098 Tomsolomon ||  || Tom Solomon (born 1962) holds a Presidential Professorship in the Department of Physics and Astronomy at Bucknell University || 
|-id=099
| 5099 Iainbanks ||  || Iain M. Banks (1954–2013), a Scottish writer || 
|-id=100
| 5100 Pasachoff || 1985 GW || Jay Myron Pasachoff (1943–2022), Field Memorial Professor of Astronomy, Williams College, United States || 
|}

5101–5200 

|-
| 5101 Akhmerov ||  || Vadim Zinov'evich Akhmerov (born 1929), doctor in the Crimean Peninsula || 
|-id=102
| 5102 Benfranklin ||  || Benjamin Franklin (1706–1790), American scientist, philosopher and statesman || 
|-id=103
| 5103 Diviš ||  || Prokop Diviš (1698–1765), Czech scientist and monk || 
|-id=104
| 5104 Skripnichenko ||  || Vladimir Ilich Skripnichenko (born 1942), Russian astronomer, staff member and deputy director of the Institute of Theoretical Astronomy in Saint Petersburg || 
|-id=105
| 5105 Westerhout ||  || Gart Westerhout (1927–2012), Dutch radio astronomer || 
|-id=106
| 5106 Mortensen || 1987 DJ || Inger Mortensen (born 1910) is an aunt of Brorfelde observer Karl Augustesen. || 
|-id=107
| 5107 Laurenbacall ||  || Lauren Bacall (1924–2014), an American actress || 
|-id=108
| 5108 Lübeck ||  || Vincent Lübeck (1654–1740), German composer and organist || 
|-id=109
| 5109 Robertmiller ||  || Robert J. Miller (born 1950), an American astronomer at the U.S. Naval Observatory || 
|-id=110
| 5110 Belgirate || 1987 SV || The Italian village of Belgirate located on the shore of Lake Maggiore in Piedmont || 
|-id=111
| 5111 Jacliff ||  || Clifford (1929–1993) and Jackie (born 1935) Holmes, American amateur astronomers || 
|-id=112
| 5112 Kusaji ||  || Shigeharu Kusaji (1879–1956), Japanese amateur astronomer || 
|-id=113
| 5113 Kohno || 1988 BN || Masaru Kohno (born 1926), Japanese classical guitar maker || 
|-id=114
| 5114 Yezo || 1988 CO || Named for Japan's northern island of Hokkaido, which was known as Yezo until 1869. || 
|-id=115
| 5115 Frimout ||  || Dirk D. Frimout (born 1941), Belgian astrophysicist and astronaut with the U.S. Space Shuttle || 
|-id=116
| 5116 Korsør || 1988 EU || Korsør, a town on the southwestern coast of Sjælland almost exactly 100 km from Copenhagen, is the birthplace of Brorfelde observer Karl Augustesen. || 
|-id=117
| 5117 Mokotoyama || 1988 GH || Mount Mokoto, in eastern Hokkaido, Japan || 
|-id=118
| 5118 Elnapoul || 1988 RB || Elna (1917–1992) and Poul Hyttel (born 1909), the parents-in-law of Brorfelde observer Karl Augustesen. || 
|-id=119
| 5119 Imbrius ||  || Imbrius, from Greek mythology. He was the son of Mentor and married to Medesicaste, an illegitimate daughter of King Priam of Troy. Imbrius was killed by Teucer during the Trojan War. || 
|-id=120
| 5120 Bitias ||  || Bitias, Trojan warrior and wandering companion of Aeneas, from Greek mythology || 
|-id=121
| 5121 Numazawa ||  || Shigemi Numazawa (born 1958), Japanese amateur astronomer, astrophotographer and space artist || 
|-id=122
| 5122 Mucha ||  || Alphonse Mucha (1860–1939), Czech artist || 
|-id=123
| 5123 Cynus || 1989 BL || Cynus, a location in the Iliad from whrere the Locrians filled forty ships as part of the Greek armada that set out against Troy. || 
|-id=124
| 5124 Muraoka || 1989 CW || Kenji Muraoka (born 1955), Japanese amateur astronomer and orbit computer || 
|-id=125
| 5125 Okushiri ||  || Okushiri Island, some 30 km to the southwest of Hokkaido, noted for its rich fishing grounds for squid and scallops. || 
|-id=126
| 5126 Achaemenides ||  || Achaemenides, mythological Greek warrior || 
|-id=127
| 5127 Bruhns ||  || Nicolaus Bruhns (1665–1697), Danish-German organist, violinist, and composer || 
|-id=128
| 5128 Wakabayashi || 1989 FJ || Wakabayashi-ku, Sendai, Japan || 
|-id=129
| 5129 Groom || 1989 GN || Steven L. Groom, a computer engineer at JPL and creator of NEAT's autonomous observing system || 
|-id=130
| 5130 Ilioneus ||  || Ilioneus, mythical person related to Trojan War || 
|-id=132
| 5132 Maynard || 1990 ME || Owen Eugene Maynard, Canadian aeronautical engineer || 
|-id=133
| 5133 Phillipadams || 1990 PA || Phillip Adams (born 1939), an Australian broadcaster, writer and social commentator || 
|-id=134
| 5134 Ebilson ||  || Elisabeth Bilson (born 1937), administrator in the Department of Astronomy at Cornell University Src || 
|-id=135
| 5135 Nibutani || 1990 UE || Nibutani, sacred land for the indigenous Ainu of Hokkaidō, Japan. || 
|-id=136
| 5136 Baggaley ||  || W. Jack Baggaley (born 1938), English radar meteor researcher at the University of Canterbury in New Zealand || 
|-id=137
| 5137 Frevert || 1990 VC || Friedrich Frevert (1914–2001), German astronomer Src || 
|-id=138
| 5138 Gyoda ||  || Gyōda, Saitama, Japan || 
|-id=139
| 5139 Rumoi ||  || Rumoi, Hokkaidō, Japan || 
|-id=140
| 5140 Kida || 1990 XH || Kinjirō Kida (1893–1962), Hokkaido-born painter, known for his landscapes, and whose work has been compared to that of Cézanne and other impressionists. || 
|-id=141
| 5141 Tachibana || 1990 YB || Tachibana, a kendo club || 
|-id=142
| 5142 Okutama || 1990 YD || Okutama Observatory, Japan || 
|-id=143
| 5143 Heracles || 1991 VL || Heracles, Greek hero || 
|-id=144
| 5144 Achates || 1991 XX || Achates, mythical Trojan warrior || 
|-id=145
| 5145 Pholus || 1992 AD || Pholus, mythological centaur || 
|-id=146
| 5146 Moiwa || 1992 BP || Mount Moiwa, the mountain that offers an outstanding panorama of the city of Sapporo and is popular both to skiers and to hikers in its virgin forest. || 
|-id=147
| 5147 Maruyama || 1992 BQ || Maruyama hill, a small hill, situated near Mt. Moiwa in the southwestern part of Sapporo and known for a beautiful park and zoo, as well as the Hokkaido Shrine. || 
|-id=148
| 5148 Giordano || 5557 P-L || Giordano Bruno (1548–1600), Italian Dominican priest || 
|-id=149
| 5149 Leibniz || 6582 P-L || Gottfried Leibniz (1646–1716), German philosopher, mathematician, and co-inventor of calculus || 
|-id=150
| 5150 Fellini || 7571 P-L || Federico Fellini (1920–1993), Italian film director || 
|-id=151
| 5151 Weerstra || 2160 T-2 || Claas Weerstra, Dutch comet chaser and administrative officer and longtime programmer at the Leiden Observatory || 
|-id=152
| 5152 Labs || 1931 UD || Dietrich Labs (born 1921), German astrophysicist and professor at Heidelberg University and Königstuhl Observatory || 
|-id=153
| 5153 Gierasch || 1940 GO || Peter J. Gierasch (born 1940), planetary scientist, co-founder of Cornell University's Center for Radiophysics and Space Research, and winner of the 2014 Gerard P. Kuiper Prize || 
|-id=154
| 5154 Leonov ||  || Yevgeny Leonov (1926–1994), Soviet artist and actor || 
|-id=155
| 5155 Denisyuk || 1972 HR || Yurij Nikolaevich Denisyuk (1927–2006), head of a laboratory at the Ioffe Physical and Technical Institute in St. Petersburg and a member of the Royal Photographic Society. || 
|-id=156
| 5156 Golant || 1972 KL || Victor Evgen'evich Golant (born 1928), director of the department of plasma physics, atomic physics and astrophysics at the Ioffe Physical and Technical Institute in Saint Petersburg || 
|-id=157
| 5157 Hindemith ||  || Paul Hindemith (1895–1963), German composer, violist and conductor || 
|-id=158
| 5158 Ogarev || 1976 YY || Nikolay Ogarev (1813–1877), a Russian poet, historian and political activist || 
|-id=159
| 5159 Burbine || 1977 RG || Thomas Burbine, American planetary scientist at Mount Holyoke College || 
|-id=160
| 5160 Camoes || 1979 YO || Luís de Camões (1524–1580) Portuguese poet || 
|-id=161
| 5161 Wightman ||  || Kingsley W. Wightman, teacher of astronomy at Chabot Space and Science Center in Oakland, California || 
|-id=162
| 5162 Piemonte || 1982 BW || Piedmont, the northwestern region of Italy, with its capital Turin || 
|-id=163
| 5163 Vollmayr-Lee ||  || Katharina Vollmayr-Lee (born 1967), a Professor in the Department of Physics and Astronomy at Bucknell University. || 
|-id=164
| 5164 Mullo ||  || Mullo, a Celtic god, associated by the Romans with Mars || 
|-id=165
| 5165 Videnom || 1985 CG || Videnom, popular weekly Danish television program on natural science. || 
|-id=166
| 5166 Olson ||  || Irvin Edward "Ole" Olson (1910–1993), an American telescope-dome manufacturer || 
|-id=167
| 5167 Joeharms ||  || John (Joe) Eric Harms, an Australian geologist || 
|-id=168
| 5168 Jenner || 1986 EJ || Edward Jenner (1749–1823), English medical doctor, who introduced the smallpox vaccine || 
|-id=169
| 5169 Duffell ||  || Stephen Duffell (born 1943), friend of Edward Bowell who discovered this minor planet || 
|-id=170
| 5170 Sissons || 1987 EH || Anthony Sissons (born 1943), friend of Edward Bowell who discovered this minor planet || 
|-id=171
| 5171 Augustesen ||  || Karl A. Augustesen (born 1945) has for several decades been the observer at the Schmidt telescope erected at Brorfelde in 1965. || 
|-id=172
| 5172 Yoshiyuki ||  || Yoshiyuki Endo (born 1953), the landowner of the Kushiro Observatory || 
|-id=173
| 5173 Stjerneborg ||  || Stjerneborg, pioneering astronomical observatory built by Tycho Brahe || 
|-id=174
| 5174 Okugi || 1988 HF || Shin Okugi (born 1952), Japanese optical engineer and director of the software division of Goto Optical Laboratory || 
|-id=175
| 5175 Ables ||  || Harold D. Ables (born 1938), American astronomer and former director at the United States Naval Observatory Flagstaff Station || 
|-id=176
| 5176 Yoichi || 1989 AU || The Japanese city of Yoichi located in southwestern Hokkaido and noted for its fruit and marine products. || 
|-id=177
| 5177 Hugowolf ||  || Hugo Wolf (1860–1903), Austrian composer || 
|-id=178
| 5178 Pattazhy ||  || Sainudeen Pattazhy (born 1962), an Indian environmentalist and zoologist || 
|-id=179
| 5179 Takeshima ||  || Toshio Takeshima (born 1930), a Japanese Iai master and friend of Tsutomu Seki who discovered this minor planet || 
|-id=180
| 5180 Ohno || 1989 GF || Keiko Ohno (born 1959), Japanese activities in promoting the public awareness of the study of astronomy and space science. She is an software developer at Goto Optical Laboratory || 
|-id=181
| 5181 SURF || 1989 GO || Summer Undergraduate Research Fellowship (SURF) program of Caltech || 
|-id=182
| 5182 Bray || 1989 NE || Olin D. Bray (born 1907), an American medical doctor and friend of Eleanor Helin who discovered this minor planet. The naming took place on the occasion of Bray's 85th birthday in 1992. || 
|-id=183
| 5183 Robyn ||  || Laurie Robyn Ernst Yeomans, wife of Donald Yeomans, president of IAU Commission 20 || 
|-id=184
| 5184 Cavaillé-Coll ||  || Aristide Cavaillé-Coll (1811–1899), member of a famous French dynasty of organ builders || 
|-id=185
| 5185 Alerossi ||  || Alessandro Rossi (born 1964), a member of the Group of Satellite Flight Dynamics at the Istituto CNECE in Pisa || 
|-id=186
| 5186 Donalu ||  || Dona(lu) Wheeler Roman, wife of American discoverer Brian P. Roman || 
|-id=187
| 5187 Domon ||  || Ken Domon (1909–1990), Japanese photographer || 
|-id=188
| 5188 Paine ||  || Thomas O. Paine (1921–1992), American metallurgist, third Administrator of NASA, and advisor to the Planetary Society || 
|-id=190
| 5190 Fry ||  || Stephen Fry (born 1957), an English writer, actor, comedian, TV presenter and activist || 
|-id=191
| 5191 Paddack ||  || Stephen J. Paddack (born 1934), an aeronautical engineer and contributor to the understanding of the Yorp effect || 
|-id=192
| 5192 Yabuki || 1991 CC || Hiroshi Yabuki (born 1960), a leading Japanese developer of automated planetarium programs at Goto Optical Laboratory || 
|-id=193
| 5193 Tanakawataru || 1992 ET || Wataru Tanaka (born 1939), Japanese astronomer and professor at the National Astronomical Observatory of Japan || 
|-id=194
| 5194 Böttger || 4641 P-L || Johann Friedrich Böttger (1682–1719), a German alchemist and one of the early inventors of hard-paste porcelain in Meissen, Germany || 
|-id=195
| 5195 Kaendler || 3289 T-1 || Johann Joachim Kaendler (1706–1775), German sculptor, later founder of the European style of porcelain in Meissen, Germany || 
|-id=196
| 5196 Bustelli || 3102 T-2 || Franz Anton Bustelli (1723–1763), Swiss artist, involved with the Nymphenburg Porcelain Manufactory || 
|-id=197
| 5197 Rottmann || 4265 T-2 || Friedrich Rottmann (1797–1850), German Romantic landscape painter and father of Carl Rottmann || 
|-id=198
| 5198 Fongyunwah ||  || Yun-Wah Fong, Chinese educator and mentor of Chinese astronomer Yang Jiexing, who is an uncredited co-discoverer of this minor planet at the Purple Mountain Observatory || 
|-id=199
| 5199 Dortmund ||  || The city of Dortmund, capital of North Rhein-Westphalia, Germany || 
|-id=200
| 5200 Pamal || 1983 CM || Patrick Michael Malotki (born 1974), friend of Edward Bowell who discovered this minor planet. The naming took place on the occasion of his 21st birthday (the nickname stands for "pas mal", French for "not bad", a compliment). || 
|}

5201–5300 

|-
| 5201 Ferraz-Mello || 1983 XF || Sylvio Ferraz-Mello (born 1936), Brazilian astronomer || 
|-id=202
| 5202 Charleseliot || 1983 XX || Charles William Eliot (1834–1926), an American chemist and the 21st President of Harvard College || 
|-id=203
| 5203 Pavarotti ||  || Luciano Pavarotti (1935–2007), Italian opera singer || 
|-id=204
| 5204 Herakleitos ||  || Herakleitos, Ancient Greek philosopher || 
|-id=205
| 5205 Servián ||  || Berta E. Servián de Flores (1914–1996), the first Paraguayan woman aviator. || 
|-id=206
| 5206 Kodomonomori || 1988 ED || Kodomo no Mori (Children's Forest), Treeplanting program in Japan || 
|-id=207
| 5207 Hearnshaw || 1988 HE || John Bernard Hearnshaw (born 1946), New Zealand spectroscopist, who has guided the Mount John University Observatory through major developments over 30 years || 
|-id=208
| 5208 Royer ||  || Msgr. Ronald E. Royer, American priest, amateur astronomer and astrophotographer || 
|-id=209
| 5209 Oloosson ||  || Oloosson, a town mentioned in the Catalogue of Ships in the Iliad by Homer. || 
|-id=210
| 5210 Saint-Saëns ||  || Camille Saint-Saëns (1835–1921), French composer || 
|-id=211
| 5211 Stevenson || 1989 NX || David J. Stevenson (born 1948), New Zealand planetary scientist Src</ref> || 
|-id=212
| 5212 Celiacruz || 1989 SS || Celia Cruz (1925–2003), a Cuban-American salsa singer and performer || 
|-id=213
| 5213 Takahashi || 1990 FU || Kiichiro Takahashi, president of Takahashi Seisakusho || 
|-id=214
| 5214 Oozora ||  || Super Ōzora, Limited express train at Hokkaidō, Japan || 
|-id=215
| 5215 Tsurui || 1991 AE || Tsurui, Hokkaidō, Japan || 
|-id=216
| 5216 Cannizzo || 1941 HA || John Kendall Cannizzo (1957–2018) was an American astrophysicist who worked at the NASA's Goddard Space Flight Center. He also spent time at the Harvard College Observatory, where he met his wife Catherine Asaro, and did research as a Humboldt Fellow at the Max Planck Institute for Astrophysics. || 
|-id=217
| 5217 Chaozhou || 1966 CL || Chaozhou, a Chinese city in Guangdong Province, cradle of the Chaoshan Culture. || 
|-id=218
| 5218 Kutsak ||  || Mariya Romanovna Kutsak (1928–1997) was a schoolteacher of physics and astronomy in the city of Omsk for about 40 years || 
|-id=219
| 5219 Zemka ||  || Aleksandr Grigorjevich Zemka (born 1947), friend of the discoverer, electrotechnics engineer in Zaporozhje, both a prominent specialist and a good organizer who wins the respect of his colleagues and acquaintances. He provided valuable help to the discoverer in improving the 0.64-m telescope used for the Crimean NEA Survey || 
|-id=220
| 5220 Vika ||  || Viktoriya Semenovna Vinogradova (born 1928), doctor at the Crimean Astrophysical Observatory on the Crimean peninsula || 
|-id=221
| 5221 Fabribudweis || 1980 FB || Wenceslaus Fabri de Budweis (c. 1460–1518), Czech scientist and author of almanacs || 
|-id=222
| 5222 Ioffe ||  || Abram Ioffe (1880–1960), Russian physicist and pioneer in semi-conductor research || 
|-id=223
| 5223 McSween ||  || Harry McSween, planetary geologist and geochemist, meteorite researcher Src || 
|-id=224
| 5224 Abbe ||  || Ernst Abbe (1840–1905), German astronomer, optician, educator and director of the Jena Observatory || 
|-id=225
| 5225 Loral ||  || Loral Inc, an American manufacturer of CCDs || 
|-id=226
| 5226 Pollack || 1983 WL || James B. Pollack (1938–1994), an American planetary scientist at the NASA Ames Research Center. || 
|-id=227
| 5227 Bocacara || 1986 PE || Bocacara, a Spanish village south of the historic university city of Salamanca. It was first settled in the Middle Ages and remained a farming and herding village until the end of the 20th century. Crops included wheat, beans and garbanzos, but Bocacara was renowned in the region for its potatoes. || 
|-id=228
| 5228 Máca || 1986 VT || Jan Máca, schoolmate and friend of the discoverer, for his contribution to the protection of nature || 
|-id=229
| 5229 Irurita ||  || Irurita is one of 15 villages nestled in the Baztan Valley, within the autonomous community of Navarre in the Basque Country in northern Spain. || 
|-id=230
| 5230 Asahina || 1988 EF || Takashi Asahina, Japanese conductor || 
|-id=231
| 5231 Verne || 1988 JV || Jules Verne, French novelist and playwright || 
|-id=232
| 5232 Jordaens ||  || Jacob Jordaens, Flemish painter || 
|-id=233
| 5233 Nastes ||  || Nastes, from Greek mythology. With his brother Amphimacus, he was a leader of the Carian contingent on the side of the Trojans in the Trojan War. Nastes was killed in the river Maeander by Achilles, who stripped off his armour and golden ornaments. || 
|-id=234
| 5234 Sechenov || 1989 VP || Ivan Sechenov (1829–1905), Russian naturalist and physiologist || 
|-id=235
| 5235 Jean-Loup ||  || Jean-Loup Bertaux (born 1942), a French planetary scientist who headed the Department of Solar System Studies at CNRS || 
|-id=236
| 5236 Yoko ||  || Yoko Huruta, wife of discoverer || 
|-id=237
| 5237 Yoshikawa ||  || Katsunori Yoshikawa (born 1942), owner of the land on which the Nihondaira Observatory was built on. The observatory is located in one of the green-tea producing areas in Japan. || 
|-id=238
| 5238 Naozane ||  || Kumagai Naozane, early samurai || 
|-id=239
| 5239 Reiki ||  || Reiki Kushida, a Japanese amateur astronomer and discoverer of minor planets. She was the first woman to discover a supernova (1991bg) visually. || 
|-id=240
| 5240 Kwasan || 1990 XE || Kwasan Observatory  of Kyoto University is located near Kyoto, Japan || 
|-id=241
| 5241 Beeson || 1990 YL || Charlotte "Charlie" Beeson (born 1990) is a British astronomer, computer programmer, gymnast, dancer and musician, who undertook research at the Harvard- Smithsonian Center for Astrophysics for her Masters Thesis: Methods to Improve Near-Earth Asteroid Discovery and Spectroscopic Characterisation Rates. || 
|-id=242
| 5242 Kenreimonin || 1991 BO || Empress Dowager Kenrei, Japan || 
|-id=243
| 5243 Clasien || 1246 T-2 || Clasien Shane, wife of American astronomer William Whitney Shane (born 1923) at the Leiden and Nijmegen  observatories || 
|-id=244
| 5244 Amphilochos ||  || Amphilochos (son of Amphiaraos), mythical person related to Trojan War || 
|-id=245
| 5245 Maslyakov ||  || Aleksandr Vasil'evich Maslyakov, Russian TV journalist, known for the program "Club of Merry and Resourceful Persons" (KVN) || 
|-id=246
| 5246 Migliorini || 1979 OB || Fabio Migliorini (1971–1997), a young researcher who died in a mountain accident || 
|-id=247
| 5247 Krylov ||  || Aleksey Krylov (1863–1945), a Russian mathematician and naval architect || 
|-id=248
| 5248 Scardia || 1983 GQ || Marco Scardia (born 1948), Italian astrometrist at the Merate and Brera observatories in northern Italy || 
|-id=249
| 5249 Giza || 1983 HJ || Giza, Egyptian city on the west bank of the Nile, known for some of Egypt's greatest antiquities || 
|-id=250
| 5250 Jas || 1984 QF || Czech for 'brightness' and the initials of the South Bohemian Astronomical Society (Jihočeská Astronomická Společnost) || 
|-id=251
| 5251 Bradwood || 1985 KA || Frank Bradshaw Wood, American astronomer || 
|-id=252
| 5252 Vikrymov ||  || Viktor Aleksandrovich Krymov (born 1929), deputy director of the Institute of Theoretical Astronomy (ITA) in St Peterburg, Russia || 
|-id=253
| 5253 Fredclifford || 1985 XB || Fred Clifford (1924–1980) was a mariner, joining the U.S. Merchant Marine in 1943 to fulfill a life-long dream of going to sea. He was a forward thinker and inspired early technological development of foam-core surfboards and was co-owner of Clifford/George Surfboards in Santa Barbara, California, USA in the 1960s. || 
|-id=254
| 5254 Ulysses ||  || Odysseus (Roman name: "Ulysses"), mythological Greek king || 
|-id=255
| 5255 Johnsophie || 1988 KF || John and Sophie Karayusuf, parents of Alford S. Karayusuf, a friend of the discoverer. Under the starry skies of the Syrian Desert, they inspired their children to study the stars and planets and to wonder in amazement at the ability of mankind to explore the heavens || 
|-id=256
| 5256 Farquhar || 1988 NN || Robert W. Farquhar (1932–2015), an American mission design specialist at NASA || 
|-id=257
| 5257 Laogonus ||  || Laogonus, from Greek mythology. He was the son of Bias and grandson of King Priam of Troy. Laogonus and his brother Dardanus were killed by Achilles, who knocked the brothers from their chariots, smiting one with a cast of his spear and the other with his sword in close fight. || 
|-id=258
| 5258 Rhoeo ||  || Rhoeo was thrown in the ocean locked in a chest after her father learned she was pregnant. She was guided by Apollo, her lover, to the island of Delos where she gave birth to Anius, who later prophesied that the siege of Troy would go on for ten years. || 
|-id=259
| 5259 Epeigeus ||  || Epeigeus, mythical person related to Trojan War || 
|-id=260
| 5260 Philvéron || 1989 RH || Philippe Véron, French astronomer || 
|-id=261
| 5261 Eureka || 1990 MB || Eureka!, Greek exclamation of discovery || 
|-id=262
| 5262 Brucegoldberg ||  || Bruce A. Goldberg, an American scientist at JPL and USAF Phillips Laboratory, was a friend of Eleanor F. Helin, who discovered this minor planet. || 
|-id=263
| 5263 Arrius ||  || Harrison Callum Bertram Steel (born 1992), son of British discoverer Duncan Steel || 
|-id=264
| 5264 Telephus || 1991 KC || Telephus, mythical person related to Trojan War || 
|-id=265
| 5265 Schadow || 2570 P-L || Johann Gottfried Schadow (1764–1850), German sculptor whose work includes the chariot on top of the Brandenburg Gate in Berlin || 
|-id=266
| 5266 Rauch || 4047 T-2 || Christian Daniel Rauch, German sculptor || 
|-id=267
| 5267 Zegmott || 1966 CF || Tarik Zegmott (born 1992) is a British Astronomy PhD student whose research for his Masters thesis, "Optimising Observing Strategies for Near-Earth Asteroid Characterisation", was undertaken at the Harvard-Smithsonian Center for Astrophysics. || 
|-id=268
| 5268 Černohorský ||  || Martin Cernohorský, Czech physicist. || 
|-id=269
| 5269 Paustovskij ||  || Konstantin Paustovsky (1892–1968), Russian writer || 
|-id=270
| 5270 Kakabadze || 1979 KR || David Kakabadze (1889–1952), a Georgian painter and avantgardist || 
|-id=271
| 5271 Kaylamaya ||  || Kayla Maya Soderblom was the daughter of planetary scientist Jason Soderblom and granddaughter of planetary scientist Larry Soderblom. Born with a congenital heart problem, Kayla lived only 15 months, but was a source of happiness and inspiration for all who knew her. || 
|-id=272
| 5272 Dickinson ||  || Terence Dickinson (1943–2023), Canadian astronomy populariser || 
|-id=273
| 5273 Peilisheng ||  || Pei Lisheng, 20th-century Chinese satellite scientist and oceanographer || 
|-id=274
| 5274 Degewij || 1985 RS || Johan Degewij (born 1944), Dutch astronomer || 
|-id=275
| 5275 Zdislava || 1986 UU || Saint Zdislava (sv. Zdislava), Moravian noblewoman, wife of Markvartic Havel, Duke of Lemberk, known for her generosity to the poor, and an early lay member of the Dominican Order || 
|-id=276
| 5276 Gulkis || 1987 GK || Samuel Gulkis, an American astronomer and expert in radio and submillimeter astronomy at JPL, was a supporter of the NEAT program || 
|-id=277
| 5277 Brisbane || 1988 DO || Brisbane, the name of the capital city of Queensland, itself honors Sir Thomas Makdougall Brisbane, an astronomer and the colonial governor who established Australia's first permanent observatory in 1822. The minor planet's discoverer was born 20 km from Brisbane's birthplace in Ayrshire, Scotland || 
|-id=278
| 5278 Polly ||  || Polly Brooks, member of the Planetary Society's New Millennium Committee || 
|-id=279
| 5279 Arthuradel || 1988 LA || Arthur Adel, American astrophysicist || 
|-id=280
| 5280 Andrewbecker || 1988 PT || Andrew C. Becker (born 1973), an American astronomer and data scientist at the University of Washington. || 
|-id=281
| 5281 Lindstrom ||  || Marilyn Lindstrom (born 1946) (born Marilyn R. Martin), American planetary geologist and curator of the U.S. Antarctic meteorite collection at NASA's Johnson Space Center || 
|-id=282
| 5282 Yamatotakeru || 1988 VT || Yamato Takeru, Japanese legendary prince || 
|-id=283
| 5283 Pyrrhus || 1989 BW || Neoptolemus, son of Achilles || 
|-id=284
| 5284 Orsilocus ||  || Greek warrior Orsilochus, son of Diocles and twin brother of Crethon, killed by Aeneas during the Trojan War || 
|-id=285
| 5285 Krethon ||  || Greek warrior Crethon (Krethon), son of Diocles and twin brother of Orsilochus, killed by Aeneas during the Trojan War || 
|-id=286
| 5286 Haruomukai ||  || Haruo Mukai (1949–1986) was the younger brother of Japanese astronomer Masaru Mukai, who co-discovered this minor planet || 
|-id=287
| 5287 Heishu || 1989 WE || Heishu Hosoi, Japanese confucianist || 
|-id=288
| 5288 Nankichi || 1989 XD || Nankichi Niimi, Japanese author || 
|-id=289
| 5289 Niemela ||  || Born in Helsinki, Virpi Niemela (born 1936) moved to Argentina at the age of 17. She received her Ph.D. in astronomy at La Plata observatory, where she has conducted her professional work. Her main field of research is massive stars, an area to which she has contributed over 150 refereed papers || 
|-id=290
| 5290 Langevin ||  || Yves Langevin (born 1951), French planetary scientist at the Institut d'Astrophysique Spatiale in Orsay || 
|-id=291
| 5291 Yuuko || 1990 YT || Yuuko Matsuyama, wife of discoverer || 
|-id=292
| 5292 Mackwell ||  || Stephen J. Mackwell (born 1956) is the Director of the Lunar and Planetary Institute. || 
|-id=293
| 5293 Bentengahama ||  || Benten beach (Bentengahama), a sandy beach near Kushiro in northern Japan, where the co-discoverer, Kazuro Watanabe, spent his childhood. || 
|-id=294
| 5294 Onnetoh || 1991 CB || Lake Onnetō, Hokkaidō, Japan || 
|-id=295
| 5295 Masayo || 1991 CE || Masayo Mizuno, wife of discoverer || 
|-id=296
| 5296 Friedrich || 9546 P-L || Caspar David Friedrich (1774–1840), German Romantic landscape painter || 
|-id=297
| 5297 Schinkel || 4170 T-2 || Karl Friedrich Schinkel (1781–1841), German architect and painter || 
|-id=298
| 5298 Paraskevopoulos || 1966 PK || John Stefanos Paraskevopoulos, Greek astronomer, director of the Athens Observatory and later superintendent of the Boyden Observatory || 
|-id=299
| 5299 Bittesini || 1969 LB || Luciano Bittesini (born 1950), Italian amateur astronomer and astrometrist at Farra d'Isonzo Observatory || 
|-id=300
| 5300 Sats ||  || Nataliya Il'inichna Sats (1903–1993), Soviet author and founder of the Moscow Musical Children's Theater || 
|}

5301–5400 

|-
| 5301 Novobranets ||  || Vasilij Andreevich Novobranets (1904–1984), Russian and Ukrainian writer. || 
|-id=302
| 5302 Romanoserra ||  || Romano Serra (born 1954), Italian physicist || 
|-id=303
| 5303 Parijskij ||  || Yurij Nikolaevich Parijskij (born 1932), Russian radio astronomer and cosmologist || 
|-id=304
| 5304 Bazhenov ||  || Vasily Bazhenov (1737–1799), Russian architect || 
|-id=305
| 5305 Bernievolz ||  || Bernard Volz (born 1961), American amateur astronomer and former president of the Amherst Area Amateur Astronomers Association || 
|-id=306
| 5306 Fangfen || 1980 BB || Fen Fang, Chinese astronomer || 
|-id=307
| 5307 Paul-André || 1980 YC || Paul-André Herbelin (1933–1994), Swiss friend of the American discoverer Edward Bowell || 
|-id=308
| 5308 Hutchison ||  || Robert Hutchison (born 1938) former curator of meteorites at the Natural History Museum, London || 
|-id=309
| 5309 MacPherson ||  || Glenn Joseph MacPherson (born 1950), curator at the National Museum of Natural History in Washington, D.C. || 
|-id=310
| 5310 Papike ||  || James Papike (born 1937), director emeritus of the Institute of Meteoritics at the University of New Mexico. || 
|-id=311
| 5311 Rutherford ||  || Ernest Rutherford (1871–1937), born and educated in New Zealand, won the 1908 Nobel Prize for Chemistry for his work on radioactive disintegration of elements. He was the first to develop radioactive dating of the Earth, established the nuclear atom, and predicted the existence of the neutron. || 
|-id=312
| 5312 Schott ||  || Otto Schott (1851–1935), a German chemist, glass technologist, and the inventor of borosilicate glass || 
|-id=313
| 5313 Nunes ||  || Pedro Nunes (1502–1578), Portuguese mathematician and geographer || 
|-id=314
| 5314 Wilkickia ||  || Andrey Vilkitsky (1858–1913) and Boris Vilkitsky (1885–1961), father and son, Russian hydrographers and Arctic explorers || 
|-id=315
| 5315 Balʹmont ||  || Konstantin Balmont (1867–1942), a Russian symbolist poet and translator || 
|-id=316
| 5316 Filatov ||  || Vladimir Filatov (1875–1956), ophthalmologist and surgeon || 
|-id=317
| 5317 Verolacqua || 1983 CE || Veronica Lynn Passalacqua, a volunteer who compiled the International Comet Quarterly archive of photometric data on comets || 
|-id=318
| 5318 Dientzenhofer ||  || Kryštof Dientzenhofer, Czech architect || 
|-id=319
| 5319 Petrovskaya ||  || Margarita Sergeevna Petrovskaya (born 1933), Russian astronomer and staff member of the Institute of Theoretical Astronomy in Saint Petersburg || 
|-id=320
| 5320 Lisbeth || 1985 VD || Lisbeth Fogh Olsen, daughter of Danish co-discoverer Hans Jørn Fogh Olsen || 
|-id=321
| 5321 Jagras || 1985 VN || Jakob Grove Rasmussen, fiancé of the daughter of Danish co-discoverer Hans Jørn Fogh Olsen || 
|-id=323
| 5323 Fogh ||  || Hans Jørn Fogh Olsen (born 1943), Danish astronomer and discoverer of minor planets at Brorfelde Observatory || 
|-id=324
| 5324 Lyapunov || 1987 SL || Aleksandr Mikhailovich Lyapunov (1857–1918), Russian mathematician, engineer and physicist || 
|-id=325
| 5325 Silver || 1988 JQ || Leon Silver (born 1925), professor of geology at Caltech || 
|-id=326
| 5326 Vittoriosacco ||  || Vittorio Sacco (born 1941), an Italian amateur astronomer and popularizer of astronomy. || 
|-id=327
| 5327 Gertwilkens ||  || Gert Wilkens (born 1957) has been the financial administrator of Stichting De Koepel, former Dutch center for the popularization of astronomy and space science. He serves as librarian of the astronomical library of Sonnenborgh Observatory in Utrecht in the Netherlands. Wilkens is a co-editor of the astronomical annual Sterrengids. || 
|-id=328
| 5328 Nisiyamakoiti ||  || Koichi Nishiyama, Japanese mountaineer and amateur astronomer, meteor, comet, and nova hunter || 
|-id=329
| 5329 Decaro || 1989 YP || Mario De Caro, Italian philosopher || 
|-id=330
| 5330 Senrikyu ||  || Sen no Rikyū, Japanese tea master || 
|-id=331
| 5331 Erimomisaki ||  || Cape Erimo, Hokkaidō, Japan || 
|-id=332
| 5332 Davidaguilar || 1990 DA || David Aguilar, American director of public affairs at the Harvard-Smithsonian Center for Astrophysics, astronomical photographer, and telescope maker || 
|-id=333
| 5333 Kanaya || 1990 UH || Kanaya, Shizuoka, Japan || 
|-id=334
| 5334 Mishima || 1991 CF || Mishima, Shizuoka, Japan || 
|-id=335
| 5335 Damocles || 1991 DA || Damocles, mythological Greek figure || 
|-id=337
| 5337 Aoki || 1991 LD || Masahiro Aoki (1920–1984), Japanese amateur astronomer || 
|-id=338
| 5338 Michelblanc ||  || Michel Blanc (born 1949), French planetary scientist and director of the Pic du Midi Observatory || 
|-id=340
| 5340 Burton || 4027 P-L || William Butler Burton (born 1940), American professor of astronomy at the University of Leiden || 
|-id=341
| 5341 Purgathofer || 6040 P-L || Alois Purgathofer (1925–1983), Austrian astronomer || 
|-id=342
| 5342 Le Poole || 3129 T-2 || Rudolf Le Poole (born 1942), Dutch astronomer at Leiden || 
|-id=343
| 5343 Ryzhov ||  || Yurij Aleksandrovich Ryzhov (born 1930), a member of the Russian Academy of Sciences || 
|-id=344
| 5344 Ryabov || 1978 RN || Yurij Aleksandrovich Ryabov (born 1923), professor at the Moscow Road-Transport Institute || 
|-id=345
| 5345 Boynton ||  || William Boynton (born 1944), professor of cosmochemistry and geochemistry at the University of Arizona, has measured elemental abundances in meteorites as a means of probing the early history of the solar system. He is the team leader for the gamma-ray spectrometer on the 2001 Mars Odyssey spacecraft || 
|-id=346
| 5346 Benedetti ||  || Mario Benedetti (1920–2009), an internationally-renowned Uruguayan writer and member of the so-called 45 Generation of writers, essayists and poets. He received several national and international awards, including the VII Premio Reina Sofia de Poesia Iberoamericana in 1999. || 
|-id=347
| 5347 Orestelesca ||  || Oreste Lesca, amateur astronomer. || 
|-id=348
| 5348 Kennoguchi || 1988 BB || Ken Noguchi (b.~1973) is a Japanese alpinist and environmental activist. In 1999 he reached the summit of Mt. Everest and became the youngest person in the world (at that time) to climb the highest mountains on each of the seven continents || 
|-id=349
| 5349 Paulharris || 1988 RA || Paul P. Harris (1868–1947), founder of Rotary International in 1905 || 
|-id=350
| 5350 Epetersen ||  || Erik V. Petersen (born 1911), Danish amateur astronomer || 
|-id=351
| 5351 Diderot ||  || Denis Diderot, French writer || 
|-id=352
| 5352 Fujita || 1989 YN || Yoshio Fujita, Japanese astrophysicist and professor emeritus of the University of Tokyo || 
|-id=354
| 5354 Hisayo ||  || Hisayo Kaneda, daughter of second discoverer. || 
|-id=355
| 5355 Akihiro || 1991 CA || Akihiro Ueda, son of first discoverer. || 
|-id=356
| 5356 Neagari ||  || Neagari, the name of an old town in Nomi District, Ishikawa Prefecture, Japan. || 
|-id=357
| 5357 Sekiguchi || 1992 EL || Tomohiko Sekiguchi (born 1970), an associate professor at Hokkaido University of Education since 2008. || 
|-id=358
| 5358 Meineko || 1992 QH || Meineko is the pen name of Kiyota Seiichiro (born 1962), who has been observing variable stars since 1975. As Meineko, he has written a monthly guide on variable stars in the Japanese astronomy magazine Gekkan Tenmon and on CCD observation methods in textbooks. || 
|-id=359
| 5359 Markzakharov ||  || Mark Anatolievich Zakharov (born 1933), Russian producer || 
|-id=360
| 5360 Rozhdestvenskij ||  || Robert Ivanovich Rozhdestvenskij (1932–1994), Russian poet, journalist and popular songwriter || 
|-id=361
| 5361 Goncharov ||  || Ivan Goncharov (1812–1891) is known for his four novels Oblomov, Obryv ("Precipice"), Obyknovennaya istoriya ("Unusual event") and Fregat "Pallada" ("Frigate Pallada"). || 
|-id=362
| 5362 Johnyoung || 1978 CH || John W. Young (1930–2018) was a United States naval aviator and test pilot and NASA astronaut. He flew on Gemini 3, Gemini 10, Apollo 10, Apollo 16 (becoming the ninth person to walk on the Moon), and commanded two Space Shuttle missions (STS-1 and STS-9). || 
|-id=363
| 5363 Kupka || 1979 UQ || František Kupka (1871–1957), Czech painter and graphic artist || 
|-id=365
| 5365 Fievez ||  || Charles Fiévez (1844–1890), pioneer of astronomical spectroscopy in Belgium † || 
|-id=366
| 5366 Rhianjones ||  || Rhian Jones (born 1960), an experimental and sample petrologist at the Institute of Meteoritics at the University of New Mexico. || 
|-id=367
| 5367 Sollenberger || 1982 TT || Paul Sollenberger (1891–1995), American astronomer and first civilian director of Time Service at the United States Naval Observatory || 
|-id=368
| 5368 Vitagliano ||  || Aldo Vitagliano (born 1948), Italian astronomer || 
|-id=369
| 5369 Virgiugum ||  || Jungfraujoch (latinized), a site in the Swiss Alps and location of the Sphinx Observatory || 
|-id=370
| 5370 Taranis || 1986 RA || Celtic god Taranis || 
|-id=372
| 5372 Bikki || 1987 WS || Bikki Sunazawa, Ainu sculptor || 
|-id=374
| 5374 Hokutosei ||  || Hokutosei, Japanese overnight limited express || 
|-id=375
| 5375 Siedentopf ||  || Heinrich Siedentopf (1906–1963), a German astronomer and director of the Jena Observatory and Sternwarte Tübingen. || 
|-id=377
| 5377 Komori || 1991 FM || Yukimasa Komori (1900–), Japanese owner of Astro-Dome. He was also a member of the committee at Gotoh Planetarium || 
|-id=378
| 5378 Ellyett || 1991 GD || Clifton Darfield Ellyett (born 1915), pioneer of radar meteor research in New Zealand || 
|-id=379
| 5379 Abehiroshi || 1991 HG || Hiroshi Abe (born 1958), a discoverer of numerous minor planets at Yatsuka Observatory since 1993. || 
|-id=380
| 5380 Sprigg || 1991 JT || Reg Sprigg (1919–1994), an Australian exploration geologist, oceanographer, biologist, author and conservationist. || 
|-id=381
| 5381 Sekhmet || 1991 JY || Sekhmet, Egyptian goddess || 
|-id=382
| 5382 McKay ||  || Christopher P. McKay, (born 1954), space scientist and exobiologist at NASA-Ames Research Center. || 
|-id=383
| 5383 Leavitt || 4293 T-2 || Henrietta Swan Leavitt (1868–1921), American astronomer and discoverer of the luminosity–period relation for Cepheids || 
|-id=384
| 5384 Changjiangcun || 1957 VA || Changjiangcun, Jiangsu province, China, "the famous flower of Yangtze River", Chinese homonym of the Yangtze River || 
|-id=385
| 5385 Kamenka ||  || Kamenka (Kamianka), a town in central Ukraine || 
|-id=386
| 5386 Bajaja ||  || Esteban Bajaja (born 1931), Argentine radio-astronomer || 
|-id=387
| 5387 Casleo || 1980 NB || The Leoncito Astronomical Complex (CASLEO) in Argentina || 
|-id=388
| 5388 Mottola ||  || Stefano Mottola, Italian astronomer and a discoverer of minor planets || 
|-id=389
| 5389 Choikaiyau ||  || Kai-Yau Choi, Chinese director of the Zhongshan Scientific Center and chairman of the Choi Educational Foundation || 
|-id=390
| 5390 Huichiming ||  || For his help in alleviating poverty, Hui Chi Ming (born 1964) received the China Glory Facilitative Poverty Aid Award and the United Nations Humanity and Peace Promotion Award. || 
|-id=391
| 5391 Emmons ||  || Richard H. Emmons (1919–2005), American physicist and astronomy educator || 
|-id=392
| 5392 Parker || 1986 AK || Donald C. Parker (1939–2015), American amateur astronomer || 
|-id=393
| 5393 Goldstein || 1986 ET || Richard M. Goldstein (born 1927), radar astronomer at the Jet Propulsion Laboratory || 
|-id=394
| 5394 Jurgens ||  || Raymond Francis Jurgens (born 1937), American radar astronomer at the Jet Propulsion Laboratory || 
|-id=395
| 5395 Shosasaki ||  || Sho Sasaki (born 1960), a professor at the University of Tokyo. || 
|-id=397
| 5397 Vojislava ||  || Vojislava Protić–Benišek (born 1946), daughter of Serbian astronomer Milorad B. Protić || 
|-id=399
| 5399 Awa || 1989 BT || Awa Province, ancient name of Tokushima prefecture, Japan || 
|}

5401–5500 

|-
| 5401 Minamioda || 1989 EV || Minamioda, Kamikawa, Hyōgo, Japan || 
|-id=402
| 5402 Kejosmith ||  || Keith C. Smith and his wife Joan Furlong, stellar and laboratory spectroscopists University College, London, respectively || 
|-id=403
| 5403 Takachiho || 1990 DM || Takachiho, Miyazaki, Japan || 
|-id=404
| 5404 Uemura ||  || Naomi Uemura, Japanese adventurer || 
|-id=405
| 5405 Neverland || 1991 GY || Neverland, fictional land where Peter Pan, Tinker Bell and other mythical creatures and beings live || 
|-id=406
| 5406 Jonjoseph ||  || Jonathan Joseph, programmer analyst at the Department of Astronomy of Cornell University Src || 
|-id=408
| 5408 Thé || 1232 T-1 || Pik-Sin Thé (born 1927), an Indonesian astronomer, who was a member of the IAU and director of Bosscha Observatory † || 
|-id=409
| 5409 Saale || 1962 SR || Saale, German river || 
|-id=410
| 5410 Spivakov || 1967 DA || Vladimir Spivakov (born 1944 ), Russian conductor and violinist || 
|-id=411
| 5411 Liia ||  || Liia Forrer-Tsiganovskaja, wife of a friend of Russian discoverer Nikolai Chernykh || 
|-id=412
| 5412 Rou ||  || Aleksandr Arturovich Rou (1906–1973), Russian actor and film producer || 
|-id=413
| 5413 Smyslov ||  || Vasily Smyslov (1921–2010), Russian chess grandmaster and World Chess Champion from 1957 to 1958 || 
|-id=414
| 5414 Sokolov ||  || Viktor Georgievich Sokolov (born 1946), Russian astronomer and staff member at the Institute for Theoretical Astronomy (ITA) || 
|-id=415
| 5415 Lyanzuridi ||  || Konstantin Petrovich Lyanzuridi (born 1934), engineer in vacuum technology and optics who has worked at the Crimean Astrophysical Observatory || 
|-id=416
| 5416 Estremadoyro ||  || Víctor Antolí Estremadoyro Robles (1913–2003), Peruvian astronomer, founder of the Peruvian Association of Astronomy and the Iberoamerican League of Astronomy || 
|-id=417
| 5417 Solovaya || 1981 QT || Nina A. Solovaya (born 1940), Russian astronomer and a celestial mechanic at Sternberg Astronomical Institute || 
|-id=418
| 5418 Joyce ||  || James Joyce, Irish writer || 
|-id=419
| 5419 Benua ||  || Nicholas Benois (Benua), Russian architect, and his sons Leon Benois, Russian architect, and Alexandre Benois, Russian painter || 
|-id=420
| 5420 Jancis ||  || Jancis Robinson, British Master of Wine, editor of The Oxford Companion to Wine, weekly contributor to the Financial Times || 
|-id=421
| 5421 Ulanova ||  || Galina Sergeyevna Ulanova, Russian ballerina || 
|-id=422
| 5422 Hodgkin ||  || Dorothy Hodgkin (1910–1994), British biochemist and Nobel Prize laureate || 
|-id=423
| 5423 Horahořejš || 1983 DC || Petr Hora Hořejš (born 1938), a Czech journalist, screenwriter and novelist. || 
|-id=424
| 5424 Covington ||  || Arthur Edwin Covington, first Canadian radio-astronomer || 
|-id=425
| 5425 Vojtěch ||  || Václav Vojtěch (1901–1932), Czech Antarctic explorer || 
|-id=426
| 5426 Sharp || 1985 DD || Robert P. Sharp (1911–2004), American professor of geology at Caltech. Expert on glaciers, the movement of sand dunes and the geology of Mars. || 
|-id=427
| 5427 Jensmartin || 1986 JQ || Jens Martin Knudsen, Danish astrophysicist || 
|-id=430
| 5430 Luu ||  || Jane Luu (born 1963), Vietnamese-American astronomer and co-discoverer of the first classical Kuiper belt object,  || 
|-id=431
| 5431 Maxinehelin || 1988 MB || Maxine Anne Helin, mother-in-law of American discoverer Eleanor F. Helin || 
|-id=432
| 5432 Imakiire || 1988 VN || Kyōko Imakiire (born 1965), Japanese yachtswoman || 
|-id=433
| 5433 Kairen ||  || Imakiire's Yacht || 
|-id=434
| 5434 Tomwhitney || 1989 ES || Thomas (Tom) D. Whitney (born 1941), longtime president of the Amherst Area Amateur Astronomers Association || 
|-id=435
| 5435 Kameoka ||  || Kameoka, Kyoto, Japan || 
|-id=436
| 5436 Eumelos || 1990 DK || Eumelos, mythical person related to Trojan War || 
|-id=438
| 5438 Lorre || 1990 QJ || Jean Lorre, an American scientist at JPL's Image Processing Laboratory || 
|-id=439
| 5439 Couturier || 1990 RW || Pierre Couturier (born 1942), French physicist and director of the Paris Observatory from 1999 to 2003 || 
|-id=440
| 5440 Terao || 1991 HD || Hisashi Terao (1855–1923), first Japanese professor of astronomy at University of Tokyo || 
|-id=441
| 5441 Andymurray ||  || Andy Murray (born 1987), Scottish professional tennis player. || 
|-id=442
| 5442 Drossart ||  || Pierre Drossart (born 1956), researcher of the CNRS at Paris Observatory || 
|-id=443
| 5443 Encrenaz ||  || Thérèse Encrenaz (born 1946), French astronomer, Director of Research at CNRS and Director of the Space Research Department at Paris Observatory || 
|-id=444
| 5444 Gautier ||  || Daniel Gautier (born 1936), French astronomer at Paris Observatory || 
|-id=445
| 5445 Williwaw ||  || Williwaw, a dramatic mountain on the skyline of Anchorage. || 
|-id=446
| 5446 Heyler ||  || Gene A. Heyler (born 1956), of the Applied Physics Laboratory of Johns Hopkins University and contributor to the NEAR Shoemaker mission † || 
|-id=447
| 5447 Lallement ||  || Rosine Lallement (born 1951), French astrophysicist || 
|-id=448
| 5448 Siebold || 1992 SP || Philipp Franz von Siebold (1796–1866), German physician, botanist and traveler, who stayed in Japan for six years || 
|-id=450
| 5450 Sokrates || 2780 P-L || Socrates, Ancient Greek philosopher || 
|-id=451
| 5451 Plato || 4598 P-L || Plato, Ancient Greek philosopher || 
|-id=453
| 5453 Zakharchenya ||  || Boris Petrovich Zakharchenya (born 1928), Russian scientist at Ioffe Institute in Saint Petersburg || 
|-id=454
| 5454 Kojiki ||  || Kojiki, the first written mythology of Japan || 
|-id=455
| 5455 Surkov ||  || Vladimir Vasil'evich Surkov (born 1945), Russian database expert and staff member of the Moscow Aviation Institute || 
|-id=456
| 5456 Merman ||  || Grigorij (Hirsh) Aronovich Merman (born 1921), staff member of the Institute of Theoretical Astronomy (ITA) in Saint Petersburg || 
|-id=457
| 5457 Queen's ||  || Queen's University, Kingston, Canada || 
|-id=458
| 5458 Aizman ||  || Mikhail Iosifovich Aizman (born 1947), Russian telecommunications specialist and president of MTU-INFORM, a large telephone communication and data transfer system in Russia || 
|-id=459
| 5459 Saraburger ||  || Sara Schöffer-Burger (born 1894), who helped Dutch Jews in World War II || 
|-id=460
| 5460 Tsénaatʼaʼí || 1983 AW || Navajo for "flying rock" (1996 Flagstaff Festival of Science asteroid naming contest winner) || 
|-id=461
| 5461 Autumn ||  || Autumn Dongxia Thomas (born 2002), is the granddaughter of Norman G. Thomas who discovered this minor planet. || 
|-id=463
| 5463 Danwelcher || 1985 TO || Dan Welcher (born 1948), American composer and conductor || 
|-id=464
| 5464 Weller ||  || Harold Weller (born 1941), American conductor || 
|-id=465
| 5465 Chumakov ||  || Mikhail Chumakov (1909–1993), Russian microbiologist and virologist || 
|-id=466
| 5466 Makibi ||  || Kibi Makibi, Japanese scholar and noble || 
|-id=468
| 5468 Hamatonbetsu || 1988 BK || Hamatonbetsu, Hokkaidō, Japan || 
|-id=470
| 5470 Kurtlindstrom ||  || Kurt Leighton Lindstrom (born 1955), American program executive for NASA's New Horizons Pluto-Kuiper Belt mission || 
|-id=471
| 5471 Tunguska ||  || Tunguska, site of a presumed asteroidal impact || 
|-id=473
| 5473 Yamanashi || 1988 VR || Yamanashi Prefecture, Japan || 
|-id=474
| 5474 Gingasen ||  || Furusato Ginga Line of Hokkaidō Chihoku Kōgen Railway, Japan (Abolished in 2006) || 
|-id=475
| 5475 Hanskennedy || 1989 QO || Hans D. Kennedy (born 1924) is a Dutch-Australian astronomer || 
|-id=476
| 5476 Mulius ||  || Mulius, a Trojan warrior in Greek mythology. He was killed during the Trojan War by Achilles, who drove his javelin through one ear and out the other of Mulius' head. || 
|-id=477
| 5477 Holmes ||  || Robert E. Holmes Jr. (b.~1956), amateur astronomer, who directs the Astronomical Research Observatory in Westfield, Illinois || 
|-id=478
| 5478 Wartburg ||  || The Wartburg Castle, in central Germany || 
|-id=479
| 5479 Grahamryder ||  || Graham Ryder (1949–2002), British lunar geologist || 
|-id=481
| 5481 Kiuchi || 1990 CH || Tsuruhiko Kiuchi (born 1954), Japanese amateur astronomer || 
|-id=482
| 5482 Korankei || 1990 DX || Kōrankei, a Japanese town located in the middle of Aichi prefecture || 
|-id=483
| 5483 Cherkashin ||  || Andrej Andreevich Cherkashin (1920–1993), a Russian literary scholar and historian, researcher of A. S. Pushkin's genealogy and author of The Millennial Family Tree of Pushkin || 
|-id=484
| 5484 Inoda ||  || Shigeru Inoda, Japanese amateur astronomer || 
|-id=485
| 5485 Kaula ||  || William M. Kaula, Australian-American geophysicist Src || 
|-id=488
| 5488 Kiyosato ||  || Kiyosato, a town of Hokuto, Yamanashi, Japan || 
|-id=489
| 5489 Oberkochen ||  || Oberkochen, town in southern Germany || 
|-id=490
| 5490 Burbidge || 2019 P-L || Margaret Burbidge (1919–2020), British astrophysicist || 
|-id=491
| 5491 Kaulbach || 3128 T-1 || Wilhelm von Kaulbach (1805–1874), a German painter || 
|-id=492
| 5492 Thoma || 3227 T-1 || Hans Thoma (1839–1924), German painter || 
|-id=493
| 5493 Spitzweg || 1617 T-2 || Carl Spitzweg (1808–1885), German painter || 
|-id=494
| 5494 Johanmohr ||  || Johan Maurits Mohr (1716–1775), Dutch-German pastor, astronomer and meteorologist || 
|-id=495
| 5495 Rumyantsev ||  || Nikolay Rumyantsev (1754–1826), Foreign Minister and Chancellor of the Russian Empire || 
|-id=497
| 5497 Sararussell || 1975 SS || Sara Russell (born 1966), British meteoriticist at the Natural History Museum || 
|-id=498
| 5498 Gustafsson ||  || Bengt Gustafsson (born 1943), Swedish astronomer || 
|-id=500
| 5500 Twilley || 1981 WR || Royston C. Twilley, British teacher of the discoverer Edward L. G. Bowell || 
|}

5501–5600 

|-id=502
| 5502 Brashear || 1984 EC || John Brashear (1840–1920), American astronomer and instrument builder || 
|-id=504
| 5504 Lanzerotti ||  || Louis J. Lanzerotti (born 1938), an American space physicist || 
|-id=505
| 5505 Rundetaarn ||  || The "Rundetaarn", or Round Tower, is the astronomical observatory built in the heart of Copenhagen from 1637 to 1642 by king Christian IV. Its unique interior spiral staircase makes it possible to stroll all the way to the top. || 
|-id=506
| 5506 Artiglio ||  || The Artiglio, an Italian steamship used as a salvage ship in the early 20th century. || 
|-id=507
| 5507 Niijima || 1987 UJ || Tsuneo Niijima, Japanese amateur astronomer || 
|-id=508
| 5508 Gomyou || 1988 EB || Gomyou, north of Kakegawa, Japan. Location of the discovering Oohira Station. || 
|-id=509
| 5509 Rennsteig ||  || The Rennsteig, a long ridge walk in the Thuringian Forest, Germany || 
|-id=511
| 5511 Cloanthus ||  || Cloanthus, mythical person related to Trojan War: Cloanthus wins the ship race held as part of Anchises' funeral games (Aeneid, Book V) || 
|-id=513
| 5513 Yukio || 1988 WB || Yukio Hasegawa (born 1950), Japanese amateur astronomer and telescope maker || 
|-id=514
| 5514 Karelraška ||  || Karel Raška (1909–1987), a Czech physician and epidemiologist, known as "the father of the conception of epidemiologic surveillance". || 
|-id=515
| 5515 Naderi ||  || Firouz Naderi (born 1946) is a scientist, engineer and manager who has led major programs at the Jet Propulsion Laboratory. || 
|-id=516
| 5516 Jawilliamson || 1989 JK || Jack Williamson, American science-fiction author || 
|-id=517
| 5517 Johnerogers || 1989 LJ || John E. Rogers, American amateur astronomer known for his computer software and for his computation of orbits || 
|-id=518
| 5518 Mariobotta || 1989 YF || Mario Botta (born 1943), a Swiss architect || 
|-id=519
| 5519 Lellouch ||  || Emmanuel Lellouch (born 1963), planetary scientist at Observatoire de Paris. || 
|-id=520
| 5520 Natori || 1990 RB || Akira Natori (born 1956), Japanese astronomer and discoverer of minor planets || 
|-id=521
| 5521 Morpurgo ||  || Pieter Morpurgo, British producer of the long-running BBC programme The Sky at Night || 
|-id=522
| 5522 De Rop ||  || Willy De Rop (born 1933), Belgian astronomer at Uccle Observatory || 
|-id=523
| 5523 Luminet ||  || Jean-Pierre Luminet (born 1951), French researcher at the Paris Observatory. || 
|-id=524
| 5524 Lecacheux ||  || Jean Lecacheux, a French planetary scientist at Paris Observatory || 
|-id=526
| 5526 Kenzo ||  || Kenzo Suzuki, Japanese amateur astronomer || 
|-id=529
| 5529 Perry || 2557 P-L || Marcus Perry, an American chief engineer with the Spacewatch program || 
|-id=530
| 5530 Eisinga || 2835 P-L || Eise Eisinga, Frisian astronomer who built a planetarium || 
|-id=531
| 5531 Carolientje || 1051 T-2 || Caroline van Houten, granddaughter of the Dutch astronomers (husband and wife) Cornelis and Ingrid van Houten || 
|-id=532
| 5532 Ichinohe || 1932 CY || Naozō Ichinohe (1872–1920), Japanese astronomer and science writer || 
|-id=533
| 5533 Bagrov || 1935 SC || Nikolaj Vasil'evich Bagrov (born 1937), Russian geographer at the Simferopol State University || 
|-id=535
| 5535 Annefrank || 1942 EM || Anne Frank (Annelies Frank), German Jewish diarist || 
|-id=536
| 5536 Honeycutt || 1955 QN || Kent Honeycutt (born 1940), on the faculty of Indiana University, has made fundamental contributions to our understanding of the structure of accretion disks, cataclysmic variables and cool stars, as well as to the design and construction of innovative instrumentation, including spectrographs and robotic observatories. || 
|-id=537
| 5537 Sanya ||  || Sanya, located on the southern tip of Hainan Island, is the only tropical seaside tourist city in China. || 
|-id=538
| 5538 Luichewoo ||  || Lui Che-woo, Chinese mineralogist || 
|-id=539
| 5539 Limporyen ||  || Lim Por-yen (born 1914), a prestigious philanthropist who helped launch many schools and a first-class Limporyen library in China. || 
|-id=540
| 5540 Smirnova ||  || Tamara Mikhailovna Smirnova, Russian astronomer || 
|-id=541
| 5541 Seimei ||  || Abe no Seimei, Onmyōji || 
|-id=542
| 5542 Moffatt ||  || Ethelwin Moffatt (born 1926), a benefactor of the discovering Perth Observatory and direct descendant of the first Astronomer Royal, John Flamsteed. || 
|-id=543
| 5543 Sharaf ||  || Shafika Gil'mievna Sharaf (born 1915), a celestial mechanic and staff member at the Institute of Theoretical Astronomy (ITA) in Saint Petersburg, Russia || 
|-id=544
| 5544 Kazakov ||  || Matvej Fedorovich Kazakov (1738–1812), Russian architect || 
|-id=545
| 5545 Makarov ||  || Askol'd Anatol'evich Makarov (born 1925), Russian choreographer and professor of the St. Petersburg Conservatoire || 
|-id=546
| 5546 Salavat || 1979 YS || Salavat, an industrial city in the Republic of Bashkortostan, Russia || 
|-id=547
| 5547 Acadiau ||  || Acadia University, Canada Src || 
|-id=548
| 5548 Thosharriot || 1980 TH || Thomas Harriot (1560–1621), English mathematician, inventor of the < and > symbols, and who drew the Moon from Syon House, near London, on 1609 July 26 (O.S.), several months before Galileo. || 
|-id=549
| 5549 Bobstefanik ||  || Robert Phillip Stefanik (born 1938), American astronomer and director of the discovering Oak Ridge Observatory || 
|-id=551
| 5551 Glikson || 1982 BJ || Andrew Y. Glikson, was a senior research scientist with the Australian Geological Survey || 
|-id=552
| 5552 Studnička ||  || František Josef Studnička, Czech mathematician || 
|-id=553
| 5553 Chodas ||  || Paul Winchester Chodas (born 1952), Canadian astronomer and member of the Solar System Dynamics Group at the Jet Propulsion Laboratory || 
|-id=554
| 5554 Keesey ||  || Michael S. W. Keesey (born 1937), a member of the Solar System Dynamics Group at the Jet Propulsion Laboratory. || 
|-id=555
| 5555 Wimberly ||  || Ravenel N. Wimberly (born 1946), a member of the Solar System Dynamics Group at the Jet Propulsion Laboratory. || 
|-id=557
| 5557 Chimikeppuko ||  || Lake Chimikeppu, Hokkaidō, Japan || 
|-id=558
| 5558 Johnnapier ||  || John Napier of Merchiston (1550–1617), a Scottish mathematician and inventor. || 
|-id=559
| 5559 Beategordon ||  || Beate Sirota Gordon (1923–2012), Austrian-born American performing arts presenter and women's rights advocate || 
|-id=560
| 5560 Amytis || 1990 MX || Amytis Barrett (1909–2000), an American contributor to the Caltech community. This minor planet was named on the occasion of her 85th birthday. || 
|-id=561
| 5561 Iguchi || 1991 QD || Masatoshi Iguchi, president of the Photovoltaic Popularization Associaction in Japan || 
|-id=562
| 5562 Sumi || 1991 VS || Sumi Kaneda (born 2006), a granddaughter of Japanese astronomer Hiroshi Kaneda, who co-discovered this minor planet || 
|-id=563
| 5563 Yuuri ||  || Yuuri Ueda (born 2005), a granddaughter of Japanese astronomer Seiji Ueda, who co-discovered this minor planet || 
|-id=564
| 5564 Hikari ||  || Hikari Ueda (born 2010), a granddaughter of Japanese astronomer Seiji Ueda, who co-discovered this minor planet || 
|-id=565
| 5565 Ukyounodaibu ||  || Kenreimon-In Ukyō no Daibu, Japanese poet and lady-in-waiting attended to Taira no Tokuko || 
|-id=567
| 5567 Durisen ||  || Richard H. Durisen (born 1946), on the faculty of Indiana University, has applied dynamical simulations to star and planet formation, the structure and stability of astrophysical disks and planetary ring systems, and he has used numerical hydrodynamics techniques to study gravitational instabilities in disks around young stars. || 
|-id=568
| 5568 Mufson ||  || Stuart Mufson (born 1946), on the faculty of Indiana University, has built pioneering instrumentation for investigations in high-energy astrophysics, including cosmic-ray physics and the search for dark matter. He has also contributed to the understanding of the interstellar medium and of regions of star formation. || 
|-id=569
| 5569 Colby || 1974 FO || Michael John Colby (born 1952), American spacecraft integration manager of NASA's New Horizons Pluto-Kuiper Belt mission. || 
|-id=570
| 5570 Kirsan ||  || Kirsan Ilyumzhinov (born 1962), Russian chess grandmaster and president of the International Chess Federation || 
|-id=571
| 5571 Lesliegreen || 1978 LG || Leslie Green, British treasurer of the Junior Astronomical Society (now the Society for Popular Astronomy), 1967–2007. || 
|-id=572
| 5572 Bliskunov ||  || Aleksandr Ivanovich Bliskunov (1938–1996), orthopaedic surgeon from the Crimean Peninsula || 
|-id=573
| 5573 Hilarydownes || 1981 QX || Hilary Downes (born 1954) is a planetary petrologist at Birkbeck College London. She is a terrestrial mantle expert, and her planetary science research seeks to understand the geological evolution of the ureilite meteorite parent body. || 
|-id=574
| 5574 Seagrave || 1984 FS || Frank Evans Seagrave (1860–1934), an American amateur astronomer. || 
|-id=575
| 5575 Ryanpark ||  || Sang H. ("Ryan") Park (born 1978), a member of the Jet Propulsion Laboratory's Solar System Dynamics Group. || 
|-id=576
| 5576 Albanese ||  || Dominique Albanese, photographer and observer at the Schmidt telescope of the Observatoire de la Côte d'Azur. || 
|-id=577
| 5577 Priestley ||  || Joseph Priestley (1733–1804), an English clergyman. || 
|-id=578
| 5578 Takakura || 1987 BC || Emperor Takakura (1161–1181), the 80th emperor of Japan, succeeded to the throne in 1168. He was the seventh son of emperor Goshirakawa and an expert at playing the Japanese flute. || 
|-id=579
| 5579 Uhlherr || 1988 JL || H. Ralph Uhlherr, an Australian engineer, researcher with the USGS and collector of tektites. || 
|-id=580
| 5580 Sharidake ||  || Mount Shari, Hokkaidō, Japan || 
|-id=581
| 5581 Mitsuko ||  || Mitsuko Iwamoto, wife of one of discovers || 
|-id=583
| 5583 Braunerová ||  || Zdenka Braunerová, Czech artist || 
|-id=584
| 5584 Izenberg || 1989 KK || Noam Raphael Izenberg (born 1967), of the Applied Physics Laboratory of Johns Hopkins University and contributor to the NEAR Shoemaker mission Src || 
|-id=585
| 5585 Parks || 1990 MJ || Robert J. Parks (1922–2011), a US aerospace engineer and deputy director at the Jet Propulsion Laboratory || 
|-id=588
| 5588 Jennabelle ||  || Jenna Belle Weathers Roman, grandmother of the discoverer || 
|-id=589
| 5589 De Meis ||  || Salvatore De Meis (1930–2016), of Milan, is engaged in the application of astronomical calculations to the dating of historical events, particularly of Babylonian astronomy. || 
|-id=591
| 5591 Koyo ||  || Koyo Kawanishi, Japanese amateur astronomer || 
|-id=592
| 5592 Oshima ||  || Yoshiaki Oshima, Japanese amateur astronomer || 
|-id=593
| 5593 Jonsujatha ||  || Jonathan Brian Marsden and Sujatha Nagarajan, friends and neighbors of American discoverer Eleanor F. Helin || 
|-id=594
| 5594 Jimmiller ||  || James K. Miller (born 1939), celestial mechanics and orbital dynamics expert at the Jet Propulsion Laboratory. || 
|-id=595
| 5595 Roth || 1991 PJ || Mary Roth, administrative assistant in the Department of Astronomy at Cornell University Src || 
|-id=596
| 5596 Morbidelli ||  || Alessandro Morbidelli (born 1966), Italian astronomer || 
|-id=597
| 5597 Warren ||  || Jeffrey R. Warren (born 1960), of the Applied Physics Laboratory of Johns Hopkins University and contributor to the NEAR Shoemaker mission || 
|-id=598
| 5598 Carlmurray ||  || Carl Desmond Murray (born 1955), British astronomer, Professor of Mathematics and Astronomy at Queen Mary College London || 
|}

5601–5700 

|-id=603
| 5603 Rausudake || 1992 CE || Mount Rausu, Hokkaidō, Japan || 
|-id=605
| 5605 Kushida || 1993 DB || Yoshio Kushida (born 1957), Japanese seismologist || 
|-id=606
| 5606 Muramatsu || 1993 EH || Osamu Muramatsu (born 1949), who works at the planetarium in Sibuya and who has discovered numerous minor planets and comets since 1986. || 
|-id=608
| 5608 Olmos || 1993 EO || Edward James Olmos (born 1947), American actor || 
|-id=609
| 5609 Stroncone || 1993 FU || Stroncone, village in central Italy and location of the Santa Lucia Stroncone Astronomical Observatory || 
|-id=610
| 5610 Balster || 2041 T-3 || Harry H. M. Balster (born 1946), Dutch amateur astronomer and his sister Yvonne || 
|-id=612
| 5612 Nevskij ||  || Alexander Nevsky (1221–1263), a saint of the Russian Orthodox Church and legendary for his military victories over German and Swedish invaders || 
|-id=613
| 5613 Donskoj ||  || Dmitrij Donskoj (1350–1389), grand prince of Moscow and Vladimir principalities, and great-grandson of Alexander Nevsky (also see #612) || 
|-id=614
| 5614 Yakovlev || 1979 VN || Konstantin Karol'evich Yakovlev (born 1955), director of the scientific-production firm "Blok" in Saint Petersburg, Russia. || 
|-id=615
| 5615 Iskander || 1983 PZ || Fazil Iskander (1929–2016), a Soviet and Russian writer and poet || 
|-id=616
| 5616 Vogtland ||  || Vogtlandkreis (or simply: Vogtland), region in Saxony, Germany || 
|-id=617
| 5617 Emelyanenko || 1989 EL || Vyacheslav Emelyanenko (born 1952), head of the department of theoretical mechanics at South Ural University. || 
|-id=618
| 5618 Saitama || 1990 EA || Saitama Prefecture, Japan || 
|-id=619
| 5619 Shair ||  || Fredrick H. Shair, Manager of the Educational Affairs Office at the Jet Propulsion Laboratory || 
|-id=620
| 5620 Jasonwheeler || 1990 OA || Jason Wheeler Roman (born 1995), youngest son of the first discoverer || 
|-id=621
| 5621 Erb ||  || Bryan Erb (born 1931) and Dona Marie Erb (née German), Canadian space scientists Src || 
|-id=622
| 5622 Percyjulian ||  || Percy Lavon Julian (1899–1975) was an African American chemist. His groundbreaking work into synthesizing medical drugs from plants paved the way for medications that hundreds of millions of people use today. In his lifetime he received over one hundred medical patents. || 
|-id=623
| 5623 Iwamori || 1990 UY || Yasuke Iwamori, late principal of Kyoto city Rakuyou technical high school who taught physics and astronomy there. Name proposed by the discoverer following a suggestion by S. Sakabe. || 
|-id=624
| 5624 Shirley ||  || William J. and Christine Shirley, American philanthropists who have supported Caltech and Mt. Wilson Observatory and have preserved and restored the Hale Solar Laboratory in San Marino || 
|-id=625
| 5625 Jamesferguson ||  || James Ferguson (1710–1776), a Scottish astronomer. || 
|-id=626
| 5626 Melissabrucker || 1991 FE || Melissa J. Brucker (born 1977) researches small bodies in the solar system. As Deputy Principal Investigator for the Spacewatch Project, she organizes and makes observations of high priority Earth-approaching asteroids. || 
|-id=627
| 5627 Short || 1991 MA || James Short (1710–1768) was a Scottish mathematician and manufacturer of optical instruments, known for his high quality telescopes used by the Royal Society for the 1761 and 1769 transits of Venus. || 
|-id=628
| 5628 Preussen ||  || Prussia, former kingdom and German state || 
|-id=629
| 5629 Kuwana ||  || Kuwana, Mie, Japanese city located in Mie Prefecture || 
|-id=630
| 5630 Billschaefer || 1993 FZ || William Schaefer, American amateur astronomer and telescope maker || 
|-id=631
| 5631 Sekihokutouge ||  || Sekihoku Pass, Hokkaidō, Japan || 
|-id=632
| 5632 Ingelehmann || 1993 GG || Inge Lehmann (1888–1993), Danish seismologist || 
|-id=634
| 5634 Victorborge ||  || Victor Borge (1909–2000), born Borge Rosenbaum, was a Danish musician and comedian, who started his career as a classical pianist. || 
|-id=635
| 5635 Cole ||  || Joshua Cole, fictional character in Arthur Preston Hankins' novel Cole of Spyglass Mountain || 
|-id=636
| 5636 Jacobson || 1985 QN || Robert A. Jacobson (born 1944), an authority on spacecraft navigation techniques, and a developer of ephemerides for natural satellites at JPL || 
|-id=637
| 5637 Gyas ||  || Gyas, a companion of Trojan hero Aeneas from classical mythology. He participated in the ship race held as part of Anchises' funeral games (Aeneid, Book V) || 
|-id=638
| 5638 Deikoon ||  || Deicoon, mythical person related to Trojan War: son of Pergasus, killed by Agamemnon (Iliad, Book V) (not to be confused with Deicoon, one of three sons of Herakles by Megara) || 
|-id=639
| 5639 Ćuk || 1989 PE || Matija Ćuk (born 1978), astronomer, a discoverer of the BYORP mechanism and winner of the Harold C. Urey Prize in 2014 || 
|-id=640
| 5640 Yoshino ||  || The Japanese town of Yoshino (part of Kagoshima city) in southern Japan. It is the home town of the first discoverer, Masaru Mukai || 
|-id=641
| 5641 McCleese || 1990 DJ || Daniel J. McCleese, American planetary scientist and manager at JPL || 
|-id=642
| 5642 Bobbywilliams ||  || Bobby G. Williams (born 1951), celestial mechanics and spacecraft navigation expert at the Jet Propulsion Laboratory. || 
|-id=643
| 5643 Roques ||  || Françoise Roques (born 1956), French astronomer || 
|-id=644
| 5644 Maureenbell ||  || Maureen E. Ockert-Bell (born 1961), member of the NEAR Shoemaker computer team || 
|-id=647
| 5647 Sarojininaidu || 1990 TZ || Sarojini Naidu (1879–1949) was an Indian poet. She advocated for non-violence as a means for social change and was responsible for much of the strategic planning that eventually led to Indian independence. She is well known for writing The Golden Threshold, a collection of poems. || 
|-id=648
| 5648 Axius ||  || Axius is a river god who was the grandfather of the Trojan ally Asteropaios and father of Pelegon who he conceived with the mortal woman Periboea. || 
|-id=649
| 5649 Donnashirley ||  || Donna Shirley (born 1941), American engineer and author, formerly of the Jet Propulsion Laboratory, member of the Advisory Council of the Planetary Society || 
|-id=650
| 5650 Mochihito-o || 1990 XK || Prince Mochihito (died 1180), the third son of emperor Goshirakawa. He was a fount of knowledge, known for his poetry and for playing the Japanese flute. With Minamoto Yorimasa, he fought against the Heike without success. || 
|-id=651
| 5651 Traversa ||  || Gilles Traversa, technical night-assistant at the Haute-Provence Observatory in France || 
|-id=652
| 5652 Amphimachus ||  || Amphimachus from Greek mythology. Amphimachus was the son of Cteatus, a leader of the Epeians at the Trojan War and was killed by Hector. || 
|-id=653
| 5653 Camarillo ||  || The private Camarillo Observatory  in Camarillo, California, on the El Camino Real, where John Rogers secured follow-up observations of this minor planet. The town was named by the Southern Pacific Railroad in 1901 in tribute to Adolfo Camarillo (1864–1958), a prominent local rancher. The first discoverer is a former town resident. || 
|-id=654
| 5654 Terni || 1993 KG || The town and province of Terni in Italy || 
|-id=655
| 5655 Barney || 1159 T-2 || American astronomer Ida Barney (1886–1982), who worked at the Yale University Observatory and supervised the Yale Observatory Zone Catalog program || 
|-id=656
| 5656 Oldfield || A920 TA || Mike Oldfield (born 1953), English composer and multi-instrumentalist || 
|-id=657
| 5657 Groombridge ||  || Stephen Groombridge (1755–1832), British merchant and astronomer who compiled the Catalogue of Circumpolar Stars || 
|-id=658
| 5658 Clausbaader || 1950 DO || Claus Baader (1924–1995), German manufacturer of planetaria, domes and telescopes, and mentor of amateur astronomers in the German-speaking countries || 
|-id=659
| 5659 Vergara ||  || Gladys Vergara (1928–2016), Uruguayan astronomer and a director of the Astronomical Observatory of Montevideo || 
|-id=661
| 5661 Hildebrand ||  || Alan Russell Hildebrand (born 1955), Canadian geologist || 
|-id=662
| 5662 Wendycalvin ||  || Wendy Marie Calvin (born 1961) has made many important contributions to the field of planetary spectroscopy. Her work has included spectral studies of the martian surface and polar caps, Charon, Callisto and Ganymede. She has also helped pioneer the concept of using aircraft in the exploration of Mars. || 
|-id=663
| 5663 McKeegan ||  || Kevin McKeegan (born 1958), a professor of geochemistry at the University of California in Los Angeles. || 
|-id=664
| 5664 Eugster ||  || Otto Eugster (born 1938), professor at the University of Bern. || 
|-id=665
| 5665 Begemann ||  || Friedrich Begemann (1927–), German pioneering cosmochemist and meteoriticist who determined the first cosmic-ray-exposure age of a meteorite. He later investigated isotopic anomalies in meteorites and established the physical conditions that produced these anomalies. || 
|-id=666
| 5666 Rabelais ||  || François Rabelais (c. 1494–1553), French Renaissance writer, physician and humanist || 
|-id=667
| 5667 Nakhimovskaya ||  || Nakhimov Nautical College in Saint Petersburg and Russian admiral Pavel Nakhimov (1802–1855) || 
|-id=668
| 5668 Foucault || 1984 FU || Léon Foucault (1819–1868), French physicist and astronomer known for his demonstration of the Foucault pendulum in Paris in 1851, a device demonstrating the effect of the Earth's rotation. || 
|-id=670
| 5670 Rosstaylor ||  || Stuart Ross Taylor (1925–2021), New Zealand-born geochemist and planetary scientist known for his studies of the geology of the Moon through lunar samples || 
|-id=671
| 5671 Chanal || 1985 XR || Roger Chanal, French amateur astronomer || 
|-id=672
| 5672 Libby ||  || Willard Libby (1908–1980), American physical chemist noted and Nobel Prize awardee in 1960 || 
|-id=673
| 5673 McAllister ||  || Frances McAllister, American humanitarian, philanthropist and founder of "The Arboretum" at Flagstaff, Arizona || 
|-id=674
| 5674 Wolff ||  || John M. Wolff, trustee of the Wolff Foundation || 
|-id=675
| 5675 Evgenilebedev ||  || Evgeny Lebedev (1917–1997), Russian actor || 
|-id=676
| 5676 Voltaire ||  || Voltaire (1694–1778), French writer || 
|-id=677
| 5677 Aberdonia ||  || University of Aberdeen, on the occasion of the quincentenary of its founding || 
|-id=678
| 5678 DuBridge || 1989 TS || Lee Alvin DuBridge (1901–1994), American nuclear physicist, Director of MIT Radiation Laboratory and latterly of Caltech || 
|-id=679
| 5679 Akkado || 1989 VR || Akka cave, Iwate, Japan || 
|-id=680
| 5680 Nasmyth ||  || James Hall Nasmyth (1808–1890), a Scottish engineer and astronomer. || 
|-id=681
| 5681 Bakulev ||  || Aleksandr Nikolaevich Bakulev (1890–1967), a pioneering Soviet neurosurgeon || 
|-id=682
| 5682 Beresford || 1990 TB || Anthony Charles Beresford (born 1942), prominent Australian amateur astronomer. Amongst his wide-ranging astronomical interests he is an active artificial satellite observer, having been part of Operation Moonwatch from 1960 to 1975. He plays an important role in the dissemination of astronomical information and discoveries in South Australia. Always knowledgeable about current events, Tony Beresford has been of considerable help to the discoverer on many occasions. Name suggested and citation endorsed by Duncan I. Steel. || 
|-id=683
| 5683 Bifukumonin || 1990 UD || Bifukumon-In, Empress of Emperor Toba, Japan. || 
|-id=684
| 5684 Kogo ||  || Kogō no Tsubone, consort of Emperor Takakura, Japan. || 
|-id=685
| 5685 Sanenobufukui || 1990 XA || Sanenobu Fukui (born 1916), a well-known observer of Mars for more than 60 years. || 
|-id=686
| 5686 Chiyonoura || 1990 YQ || Chiyo's Beach, Kushiro, Hokkaidō, Japan || 
|-id=687
| 5687 Yamamotoshinobu ||  || Shinobu Yamamoto (1911–), director of the planetarium in Japan || 
|-id=688
| 5688 Kleewyck ||  || Canadian artist Emily Carr (1871–1945), who was given the name "Klee Wyck" by the Indigenous peoples of the Pacific Northwest Coast || 
|-id=689
| 5689 Rhön ||  || Rhön Mountains, a range of volcanic mountains in Germany || 
|-id=691
| 5691 Fredwatson || 1992 FD || Frederick Garnett Watson (born 1944) specializes in astronomical instrumentation and helped pioneer the use of fiber-optic spectroscopy. He was astronomer-in-charge of the Anglo-Australian Observatory and is currently Australia's Astronomer at Large. Through his frequent radio appearances and magazine columns, he has become a well-known public figure. || 
|-id=692
| 5692 Shirao || 1992 FR || Motomaro Shirao, Japanese photographer and amateur astronomer || 
|-id=694
| 5694 Berényi || 3051 P-L || Dénes Berényi (1928–2012), Hungarian nuclear physicist and director of the Institute of Nuclear Research of the Hungarian Academy of Sciences in Debrecen || 
|-id=695
| 5695 Remillieux || 4577 P-L || Joseph Remillieux (born 1940), French physicist || 
|-id=696
| 5696 Ibsen || 4582 P-L || Henrik Ibsen (1828–1906), Norwegian playwright || 
|-id=697
| 5697 Arrhenius || 6766 P-L || Svante August Arrhenius (1859–1927), Swedish chemist and Nobel Laureat || 
|-id=698
| 5698 Nolde || 4121 T-1 || Emil Nolde (1867–1956), German Expressionist painter || 
|-id=699
| 5699 Munch || 2141 T-3 || Edvard Munch (1863–1944), Norwegian artist || 
|-id=700
| 5700 Homerus || 5166 T-3 || Homer, Greek epic poet and author of the Iliad from which many minor-planet names are sourced || 
|}

5701–5800 

|-
| 5701 Baltuck || 1929 VS || Miriam Baltuck (born 1954), American geologist, NASA's representative in Australia and southeast Asia, director of university advancement at the Australian National University || 
|-id=702
| 5702 Morando || 1931 FC || Bruno Morando (born 1931), a French astronomer and director of the Bureau des Longitudes || 
|-id=703
| 5703 Hevelius || 1931 VS || Johannes Hevelius (1611–1687), a Polish astronomer || 
|-id=704
| 5704 Schumacher || 1950 DE || Heinrich Christian Schumacher (1780–1850), a German-Danish astronomer || 
|-id=705
| 5705 Ericsterken || 1965 UA || Eric Sterken (1948–1998), professional gardener and landscaper who took care of the gardens of the Brussels Planetarium. || 
|-id=706
| 5706 Finkelstein ||  || Andrej Mikhajlovich Finkelstein (born 1942), founder and director of the Russian Academy of Sciences' Institute of Applied Astronomy in St. Petersburg, and expert in relativistic celestial mechanics and radioastrometry || 
|-id=707
| 5707 Shevchenko ||  || Vladislav Vladimirovich Shevchenko (born 1940), head of the Russian Lunar and Planetary Research Department of the Sternberg Astronomical Institute, Moscow, and member of IAU's Working Group for Planetary System Nomenclature || 
|-id=708
| 5708 Melancholia ||  || Melancholia, one of the four humours || 
|-id=709
| 5709 Tamyeunleung ||  || Fong Tamyeunleung (born 1924), a Chinese charity worker || 
|-id=710
| 5710 Silentium || 1977 UP || Silentium (Latin for silence), by far the shortest official naming citation ever published || 
|-id=711
| 5711 Eneev ||  || Timur Magometovich Eneev (born 1924), applied mathematician and celestial mechanician at the Keldysh Institute of Applied Mathematics. || 
|-id=712
| 5712 Funke || 1979 SR || Jaromír Funke (1896–1945), a Czech photographer || 
|-id=714
| 5714 Krasinsky || 1982 PR || Georgij Al'bertovich Krasinskij (born 1939), a staff-member of the Institute of Theoretical Astronomy (ITA) in Saint Petersburg || 
|-id=715
| 5715 Kramer ||  || Kathryn Xymena Kramer, Development Director at Lowell Observatory in Flagstaff, Arizona, United States || 
|-id=716
| 5716 Pickard || 1982 UH || Elizabeth D. Pickard, philanthropist and long-time supporter of the Lowell Observatory in Flagstaff, Arizona, United States || 
|-id=717
| 5717 Damir ||  || Alim Matveevich Damir (1894–1982), a physician and professor at the First and Second Medical Institutes in Moscow || 
|-id=719
| 5719 Křižík || 1983 RX || František Křižík (1847–1941), a Czech inventor || 
|-id=720
| 5720 Halweaver || 1984 FN || Harold Anthony Weaver (born 1953), an American astronomer † || 
|-id=722
| 5722 Johnscherrer || 1986 JS || John Randell Scherrer (born 1960), American project manager and deputy payload manager on NASA's New Horizons Pluto Kuiper Belt mission || 
|-id=723
| 5723 Hudson ||  || Scott Hudson (born 1959), an American electrical engineer and radar astronomer || 
|-id=725
| 5725 Nördlingen ||  || Nördlingen, a medieval town in southern Germany || 
|-id=726
| 5726 Rubin ||  || Vera Rubin (1928–2016), an American astronomer best known for her research on galaxy rotation rates || 
|-id=730
| 5730 Yonosuke ||  || Yonosuke Nakano (1887–1974), a Japanese astronomer, educator, and co-founder of the Gekko Observatory || 
|-id=731
| 5731 Zeus ||  || Zeus, Greek god || 
|-id=734
| 5734 Noguchi ||  || Soichi Noguchi (born 1965), a Japanese astronaut || 
|-id=735
| 5735 Loripaul || 1989 LM || Lori L. Paul, environmentalist and assistant director of Telescopes in Education (TIE) at the Mount Wilson Institute and JPL || 
|-id=736
| 5736 Sanford || 1989 LW || John Sanford, former president of the Orange County Astronomers and recipient of the Bruce Blair Award || 
|-id=737
| 5737 Itoh || 1989 SK || Kazuyuki Itoh, Japanese amateur astronomer. || 
|-id=738
| 5738 Billpickering ||  || Bill Pickering (1910–2004), former director of the Jet Propulsion Laboratory || 
|-id=739
| 5739 Robertburns ||  || Robert Burns (1759–1796), a Scottish poet and lyricist. || 
|-id=740
| 5740 Toutoumi ||  || Tōtōmi Province, ancient name of western part of Shizuoka Prefecture, Japan. || 
|-id=741
| 5741 Akanemaruta || 1989 XC || Akane Maruta (1988–1998), a Japanese girl after whom the Akane Astronomical Observatory is also named || 
|-id=743
| 5743 Kato || 1990 UW || Yasuo Katō (1949–1982), a Japanese mountain climber || 
|-id=744
| 5744 Yorimasa || 1990 XP || Minamoto no Yorimasa, early samurai || 
|-id=747
| 5747 Williamina ||  || Williamina Fleming (1857–1911), a Scottish-American astronomer at Harvard College Observatory, instrumental for the creation of a stellar designation system and classifying most stars listed in the Henry Draper Catalogue. She also discovered hundreds of variable stars and dozens of nebulae, such as the Horsehead Nebula in 1888. || 
|-id=748
| 5748 Davebrin || 1991 DX || Glen David Brin (born 1950), American astrophysicist and science fiction writer || 
|-id=749
| 5749 Urduja || 1991 FV || Urduja, legendary warrior princess from the Philippines || 
|-id=750
| 5750 Kandatai ||  || Tai Kanda (born 1938), Japanese astronomer and staff member of the National Astronomical Observatory of Japan || 
|-id=751
| 5751 Zao || 1992 AC || Mount Zaō, Tōhoku region, Japan || 
|-id=753
| 5753 Yoshidatadahiko || 1992 EM || Tadahiko Yoshida, vice president of AES (Advanced Engineering Services), Japanese aerospace company || 
|-id=756
| 5756 Wassenbergh || 6034 P-L || Henri Wassenbergh (1924–2014), was a Dutch Professor of Air and Space Law at Leiden University and founder of the International Institute of Air and Space Law at Leiden || 
|-id=757
| 5757 Tichá || 1967 JN || Jana Tichá (born 1965), a Czech astronomer, director of the Kleť Observatory, and discoverer of minor planets || 
|-id=758
| 5758 Brunini ||  || Adrián Brunini (born 1959), Argentine astronomer. He is the head of the celestial mechanics group at La Plata Observatory and known for his research on the formation and evolution of the Solar System. || 
|-id=759
| 5759 Zoshchenko ||  || Mikhail Zoshchenko, Russian satirist || 
|-id=760
| 5760 Mittlefehldt ||  || David Wayne Mittlefehldt (born 1951), an American astronomer and geochemist Src || 
|-id=761
| 5761 Andreivanov ||  || Andrei V. Ivanov (born 1937), a Russian cosmochemist and meteoriticist || 
|-id=762
| 5762 Wänke ||  || Heinrich Wänke (1928–2015), an Austrian cosmochemist and meteoriticist at Max Planck Society || 
|-id=765
| 5765 Izett || 1986 GU || Glen A. Izett, an American geologist || 
|-id=766
| 5766 Carmelofalco ||  || Carmelo Falco (born 1978) is an enthusiastic amateur astronomer with great scientific and technological skills. He is president of the Ettore Majorana amateur astronomers association and scientific director of the Lematre Observatory in Racalmuto (Sicily). || 
|-id=767
| 5767 Moldun ||  || Meudon (Moldun in old Gaelic), suburb of Paris, France, and location of the Astrophysics Section of the Paris Observatory || 
|-id=768
| 5768 Pittich ||  || Eduard M. Pittich (born 1940), a Slovak astronomer || 
|-id=769
| 5769 Michard || 1987 PL || Raymond Michard (born 1925), administrator of the Côte d'Azur Observatory in France || 
|-id=770
| 5770 Aricam || 1987 RY || Arianna Laurenti (born 2017) and Camilla Laurenti (born 2017), twin granddaughters of Italian astronomer Mario Di Martino at the Turin Observatory, who was a friend of the discoverer Henri Debehogne (1928–2007). || 
|-id=771
| 5771 Somerville ||  || Mary Somerville (1780–1872), British mathematician and scientific author || 
|-id=772
| 5772 Johnlambert || 1988 LB || John V. Lambert (born 1945) has developed techniques for determining the sizes and shapes of minor planets from occultation and lightcurve observations. He is now involved in the U.S. Air Force Space Command and the Phillips Laboratory programs for the study of near-earth objects. || 
|-id=773
| 5773 Hopper || 1989 NO || Grace Hopper (December 9, 1906 – January 1, 1992) an American computer scientist and United States Navy rear admiral || 
|-id=774
| 5774 Ratliff || 1989 NR || Nicholas Paul Ratliff (1982–2002), of Oklahoma City who died at the age of 20. He was a keen baseballer and interested in astronomy, ever since he was given a telescope at the age of five. || 
|-id=775
| 5775 Inuyama || 1989 SP || Inuyama, a city in the northern part of Aichi Prefecture. || 
|-id=777
| 5777 Hanaki || 1989 XF || Many years ago, Yoichi Hanaki (born 1937) used to make astronomical observations, notably of Jupiter, with the second discoverer. Later he established the vocational training facility Hoshi-no-mura that endeavors to help mentally handicapped people. || 
|-id=778
| 5778 Jurafrance ||  || The French Jura, a department in eastern France. || 
|-id=779
| 5779 Schupmann ||  || Ludwig Schupmann, German 19th–20th-century optician, who described in Die Medial-Fernrohre a reflecting-refracting telescope with Mangin mirrors that eliminates chromatic aberrations while using common optical glasses || 
|-id=780
| 5780 Lafontaine ||  || Jean de la Fontaine, French poet || 
|-id=781
| 5781 Barkhatova ||  || Klavdiia Aleksandrovna Barkhatova (Claudia Barkhatova; 1917–1990), a Russian astronomer and founder of the Kourovka Observatory || 
|-id=782
| 5782 Akirafujiwara || 1991 AF || Akira Fujiwara, Japanese project scientist for the Hayabusa mission to the near-Earth object 25143 Itokawa || 
|-id=783
| 5783 Kumagaya || 1991 CO || Kumagaya, Saitama, Japan || 
|-id=784
| 5784 Yoron || 1991 CY || Yoronjima (Yoron island), north of Okinawa prefecture, Japan || 
|-id=785
| 5785 Fulton || 1991 FU || Joseph A. Fulton, hardware engineer and involved in the Palomar Planet-Crossing Asteroid Survey || 
|-id=786
| 5786 Talos || 1991 RC || Talos, from Greek mythology, was the nephew of Daedalus, who tried to murder him because he was jealous of his inventiveness || 
|-id=789
| 5789 Sellin || 4018 P-L || Ivan A. Sellin (born 1939), professor at Oak Ridge National Laboratory and at the University of Tennessee in Knoxville || 
|-id=790
| 5790 Nagasaki || 9540 P-L || Nagasaki, Japan || 
|-id=791
| 5791 Comello || 4053 T-2 || Georg Comello (born 1942), Dutch amateur astronomer || 
|-id=792
| 5792 Unstrut || 1964 BF || The Unstrut, a river in eastern Germany || 
|-id=793
| 5793 Ringuelet ||  || Adela Ringuelet, Argentine astronomer, co-founder of the Argentinian Astronomical Association (Asociación Argentina de Astronomía) || 
|-id=794
| 5794 Irmina ||  || Mikhailovna Golodyaevskaya (1931–1956), a Russian student of the Moscow Conservatory || 
|-id=795
| 5795 Roshchina ||  || Elena Olegovna Roshchina (1966–1994), a Russian journalist || 
|-id=796
| 5796 Klemm ||  || Per Klemm (1949–2011), a Danish professor of microbiology. || 
|-id=797
| 5797 Bivoj || 1980 AA || Bivoj, mythological Bohemian hero || 
|-id=798
| 5798 Burnett ||  || Donald Burnett (born 1937), American cosmochemist, lead investigator for the Genesis mission || 
|-id=799
| 5799 Brewington ||  || Howard J. Brewington (born 1952), American amateur astronomer and discoverer of comets || 
|-id=800
| 5800 Pollock ||  || Jackson Pollock, American artist || 
|}

5801–5900 

|-
| 5801 Vasarely || 1984 BK || Victor Vasarely (1908–1997), a Hungarian painter, sculptor, and graphic artist. || 
|-id=802
| 5802 Casteldelpiano ||  || Castel del Piano, an ancient castle near Carrara, Tuscany, Italy, that has been recently restored by two great lovers of astronomy and friends of the discoverer, Sabina Ruffaldi and Andrea Ghigliazza. || 
|-id=803
| 5803 Ötzi || 1984 OA || Ötzi the Iceman, the mummified "iceman" || 
|-id=804
| 5804 Bambinidipraga ||  || Bambini di Praga, a Czech children's choir || 
|-id=805
| 5805 Glasgow || 1985 YH || Glasgow, UK and The Astronomical Society of Glasgow || 
|-id=806
| 5806 Archieroy ||  || Archie Roy (Archibald Edmiston Roy), astronomer, Professor Emeritus of Astronomy in the University of Glasgow, Fellow of the Royal Society of Edinburgh, The Royal Astronomical Society || 
|-id=807
| 5807 Mshatka ||  || Country estate of Nikolaj Yakovlevich Danilevskij, Russian thinker || 
|-id=808
| 5808 Babelʹ ||  || Isaac Babelʹ (1894–1940), Russian writer and dramatist. Named on the commemoration of his 100th anniversary of his birth || 
|-id=809
| 5809 Kulibin ||  || Ivan Petrovich Kulibin, Russian engineer || 
|-id=811
| 5811 Keck || 1988 KC || Howard B. Keck, chairman and president emeritus of the W. M. Keck Foundation. Under Howard Keck's leadership, the Foundation provided the grants to build the giant twin telescopes of the W. M. Keck Observatory. This minor planet is being named on the occasion of the dedication of the second Keck Telescope on 1996 May 8. || 
|-id=812
| 5812 Jayewinkler ||  || Jaye Scott Winkler, a friend of American discoverer Andrew J. Noymer || 
|-id=813
| 5813 Eizaburo || 1988 VL || Eizaburo Nishibori, Japanese scientist, alpinist and technologist. || 
|-id=815
| 5815 Shinsengumi || 1989 AH || The Shinsengumi, Japanese group of samurai warriors || 
|-id=816
| 5816 Potsdam ||  || Potsdam, largest city and capital of the German state of Brandenburg, where the Potsdam Observatory is located || 
|-id=817
| 5817 Robertfrazer || 1989 RZ || Robert E. Frazer (born 1918), longtime friend and colleague of the discoverer. || 
|-id=819
| 5819 Lauretta ||  || Dante Lauretta, American cosmochemist and meteoriticist at the University of Arizona || 
|-id=820
| 5820 Babelsberg ||  || Babelsberg, the largest district of the city of Potsdam in Germany, where the Babelsberg Observatory is located || 
|-id=821
| 5821 Yukiomaeda || 1989 VV || Yukio Maeda (born 1948), well-known Japanese amateur astronomer and space engineer at the Institute of Space and Astronautical Science || 
|-id=822
| 5822 Masakichi || 1989 WL || Masakichi Hioki (born 1929), father of Japanese co-discover Tsutomu Hioki || 
|-id=823
| 5823 Oryo || 1989 YH || Oryo Narasaki (1842–1913), wife of Japanese samurai hero Sakamoto Ryōma || 
|-id=824
| 5824 Inagaki || 1989 YM || Minoru Inagaki (born 1958), Japanese classical guitarist || 
|-id=825
| 5825 Rakuyou ||  || Named for the Kyoto city Rakuyou technical high school, originally established in 1894 as Kyoto city dyeing and weaving school. || 
|-id=826
| 5826 Bradstreet || 1990 DB || David Bradstreet (born 1954), Chair of the Astronomy Department at Eastern University (St. Davids, PA). || 
|-id=827
| 5827 Letunov ||  || Yurij Aleksandrovich Letunov (1926–1984), a Russian journalist and radio commentator. || 
|-id=829
| 5829 Ishidagoro ||  || Gorō Ishida (1924–1992), Japanese astronomer || 
|-id=830
| 5830 Simohiro || 1991 EG || Hirofumi or Hiroshi Shimoda, Japanese amateur astronomer || 
|-id=831
| 5831 Dizzy || 1991 JG || John Birks "Dizzy" Gillespie, American trumpeter, co-inventor of bebop || 
|-id=832
| 5832 Martaprincipe ||  || Marta Carusi and Raffaele "Principe" Ranucci were married in Nov. 2000. The name was suggested by A. Carusi. || 
|-id=833
| 5833 Peterson || 1991 PQ || Colin A. Peterson (born 1977), a research support specialist at Cornell University. || 
|-id=834
| 5834 Kasai ||  || Kiyoshi Kasai (born 1947) was principal flutist with the Symphony Orchestra Basel (Switzerland). He is also an amateur astronomer and has discovered more than 80 new variable stars. || 
|-id=835
| 5835 Mainfranken ||  || Lower Franconia, district of Franconia in northern Bavaria, Germany. It is often called "Mainfranken" as the Main River runs through it. || 
|-id=837
| 5837 Hedin || 2548 P-L || Sven Anders Hedin (1865–1952), Swedish geographer and explorer || 
|-id=838
| 5838 Hamsun || 2170 T-2 || Knut Hamsun (1859–1952), Norwegian author, winner of the 1920 Nobel Prize for literature || 
|-id=839
| 5839 GOI ||  || The Vavilov State Optical Institute (formerly "Gosudarstvennyj Opticheskij Institut" or GOI), founded in 1918 on the initiative of its first director and physicist-optician Dmitrij Sergeevich Rozhdestvenskij (1876–1940) † || 
|-id=840
| 5840 Raybrown || 1978 ON || Raymond Matthews ("Ray") Brown, American jazz bassist, who played in Dizzy Gillespie's band and later with the Oscar Peterson Trio, husband and musical director of Ella Fitzgerald || 
|-id=841
| 5841 Stone || 1982 ST || Prof. Ed Stone is the former Director of the Jet Propulsion Laboratory (1991–2001) and the project scientist for the Voyager Mission at the Jet Propulsion Laboratory since 1972. || 
|-id=842
| 5842 Cancelli ||  || Ferdinando Cancelli (born 1969) is a doctor whose speciality is palliative medicine. He is deeply involved in ethical issues concerning the end of life and in the care of terminally ill persons. || 
|-id=845
| 5845 Davidbrewster || 1988 QP || David Brewster (1781–1868), a Scottish scientist, a populariser of science and a founder of the British Association for the Advancement of Science. || 
|-id=846
| 5846 Hessen ||  || Hesse, a German federal state || 
|-id=847
| 5847 Wakiya || 1989 YB || Nanayo Wakiya, member of Japan Planetarium Laboratory || 
|-id=848
| 5848 Harutoriko ||  || Lake Harutori, Hokkaidō, Japan || 
|-id=849
| 5849 Bhanji ||  || Alaudin Bhanji (born 1951) is a JPL engineer and Project Manager for NASA's Deep Space Network (DSN). He has ensured that the DSN's capabilities continue to enable communications with spacecraft throughout the solar system as well as providing radar characterizations of solar system bodies, including numerous asteroids. || 
|-id=850
| 5850 Masaharu || 1990 XM || Masaharu Suzuki, member of Goto Optical Mfg. Co. || 
|-id=851
| 5851 Inagawa ||  || Inagawa, a Japanese town in the Hyōgo Prefecture || 
|-id=852
| 5852 Nanette || 1991 HO || Nanette and Mark Vigil, daughter and son-in-law of Canadian co-discoverer David H. Levy || 
|-id=855
| 5855 Yukitsuna ||  || Minamoto no Yukitsuna, Japanese general in the late Heian period, who occupied the provinces of Settsu and Kawachi || 
|-id=856
| 5856 Peluk ||  || Peter-Lukas Graf (born 1929) is a Swiss musician, flutist and conductor, mainly distinguished as soloist, teacher and author. || 
|-id=857
| 5857 Neglinka ||  || The Neglinnaya River ("Neglinka"), a tributary of the Moskva River in Moscow, Russia || 
|-id=858
| 5858 Borovitskia ||  || Kremlin Hill (formerly "Borovitsky Hill"), one of the seven hills of Moscow, where the first buildings of the ancient settlement were erected, and now the location of the Red Square || 
|-id=859
| 5859 Ostozhenka ||  || Ostozhenka Street in the Khamovniki District of the Russian city of Moscow, built on a former hayfield and now part of The Golden Mile || 
|-id=860
| 5860 Deankoontz ||  || Dean Ray Koontz (born 1945) is a contemporary American author. || 
|-id=861
| 5861 Glynjones || 1982 RW || Kenneth Glyn Jones (1915–1995), British astronomer and historian || 
|-id=862
| 5862 Sakanoue || 1983 AB || Tsutomu Sakanoue (born 1921), a Japanese meteorologist and amateur astronomer || 
|-id=863
| 5863 Tara || 1983 RB || Tara, goddess in Hinduism || 
|-id=864
| 5864 Montgolfier ||  || The Montgolfier brothers, French aeronauts || 
|-id=865
| 5865 Qualytemocrina || 1984 QQ || The International Comet Quarterly, an astronomical journal and international archive of photometric data on comets || 
|-id=866
| 5866 Sachsen ||  || Saxony, a state in Germany || 
|-id=868
| 5868 Ohta || 1988 TQ || Kentarō Ohta, member of Goto Optical Mfg. Co. || 
|-id=869
| 5869 Tanith ||  || Tanit, chief deity of Carthage || 
|-id=870
| 5870 Baltimore ||  || Baltimore, Maryland, USA || 
|-id=871
| 5871 Bobbell ||  || Robert L. Bell, friend and associate of the discoverer's husband. || 
|-id=872
| 5872 Sugano || 1989 SL || Matsuo Sugano (born 1939), the first discoverer of comet C/1983 J1 || 
|-id=873
| 5873 Archilochos ||  || Archilochos, Ancient Greek poet || 
|-id=875
| 5875 Kuga || 1989 XO || Naoto or Naohito (or Tadahito) Kuga, member of Goto Optical Mfg. Co. || 
|-id=877
| 5877 Toshimaihara || 1990 FP || Toshinori Maihara (born 1942), a professor at Kyoto University and leading infrared astronomer in Japan || 
|-id=878
| 5878 Charlene ||  || Charlene Marie Anderson, Associate Director of the Planetary Society || 
|-id=879
| 5879 Almeria ||  || Almeria, the Spanish city and province where the Calar Alto Observatory of the German–Spanish Astronomical Centre is located || 
|-id=881
| 5881 Akashi ||  || Akashi, Hyōgo, a city facing the Setouchi Inland Sea, Japan. || 
|-id=883
| 5883 Josephblack ||  || Joseph Black (1728–1799), a Scottish scientist. || 
|-id=884
| 5884 Dolezal || 6045 P-L || Erich Dolezal (1902–1990), Austrian writer and popularizer of astronomy and space science, co-founder of the "Austrian Society for Space Research" || 
|-id=885
| 5885 Apeldoorn || 3137 T-2 || Ben Apeldoorn (born 1944), Dutch amateur astronomer and science publicist, on the occasion of his 50th birthday || 
|-id=886
| 5886 Rutger || 1975 LR || Lyle Lee Rutger (born 1949), American leader of the Nuclear Launch Approval office of the Department of Energy for NASA's New Horizons Pluto-Kuiper Belt mission || 
|-id=887
| 5887 Yauza ||  || The Yauza River, a tributary of the Moskva River in Moscow || 
|-id=888
| 5888 Ruders ||  || Poul Ruders (born 1949), a Danish composer || 
|-id=889
| 5889 Mickiewicz ||  || Adam Mickiewicz, poet and playwright || 
|-id=890
| 5890 Carlsberg || 1979 KG || The Carlsberg Foundation, established by philanthropist J. C. Jacobsen in 1876, who was also the founder of the first Carlsberg Brewery || 
|-id=891
| 5891 Gehrig || 1981 SM || Lou Gehrig, American baseball player || 
|-id=892
| 5892 Milesdavis ||  || Miles Dewey Davis III, American jazz trumpeter, bandleader and composer || 
|-id=893
| 5893 Coltrane || 1982 EF || John William Coltrane, American jazz saxophonist and composer || 
|-id=894
| 5894 Telč ||  || Telč, Czech Republic || 
|-id=895
| 5895 Žbirka ||  || Miroslav Žbirka (born 1952) is a Slovak singer and songwriter. Before going solo, he played in the bands Modus and Limit. His songs in Slovak, Czech and English have greatly enriched the Czech and Slovak pop music scene. He is a lifelong fan of the Beatles. The name was suggested by S. Kürti. || 
|-id=896
| 5896 Narrenschiff ||  || Named on the occasion of the quincentenary of the publication of the Narrenschiff, immortal satiric poem by Sebastian Brant, German writer and humanist || 
|-id=897
| 5897 Novotná ||  || Jarmila Novotná-Daubková (1907–1994), Czech opera singer || 
|-id=899
| 5899 Jedicke || 1986 AH || The Jedicke family: Peter Jedicke (born 1955), Robert Jedicke (born 1963), and June Jedicke-Zehr (born 1966), Canadian astronomers Src || 
|-id=900
| 5900 Jensen || 1986 TL || Poul Jensen, Danish astronomer and a discoverer of minor planets. He served in the Meridian Circle Department at the Brorfelde Observatory for 35 years, and his wife, Bodil Jensen. During the past ten years Poul also took part in the minor planet program carried out with the Schmidt telescope. Name proposed by K. Augustesen and H. J. Fogh Olsen. || 
|}

5901–6000 

|-id=902
| 5902 Talima ||  || Tatiana Alimovna Damir, friend of the discoverer, daughter of Alim Matveevich Damir (5717) and wife of Sergej Petrovich Kapitsa (5094) || 
|-id=904
| 5904 Württemberg ||  || Württemberg, Germany || 
|-id=905
| 5905 Johnson ||  || Lindley N. Johnson, American astronomer and instrumental for the NEAT program || 
|-id=907
| 5907 Rhigmus ||  || Rhigmus, son of Peires from Thracea and a Trojan warrior in Greek mythology. Rhigmus was speared by Achilles while riding in his chariot. || 
|-id=908
| 5908 Aichi || 1989 UF || Aichi Prefecture, Japan. || 
|-id=909
| 5909 Nagoya || 1989 UT || Nagoya, Aichi, Japan. || 
|-id=910
| 5910 Zátopek ||  || Emil Zátopek, Czech Olympic long-distance runner || 
|-id=912
| 5912 Oyatoshiyuki || 1989 YR || Toshiyuki Oya, Japanese amateur astronomer || 
|-id=914
| 5914 Kathywhaler || 1990 WK || Kathryn Anne Whaler (born 1956), Scottish professor of geophysics, Royal Astronomical Society president 2004–2006 || 
|-id=915
| 5915 Yoshihiro || 1991 EU || Yoshihiro Yamada (born 1946), Japanese astronomy educator || 
|-id=916
| 5916 van der Woude ||  || Jurrie van der Woude, Dutch-born former Public Affairs Officer and Image Coordinator at the Jet Propulsion Laboratory || 
|-id=917
| 5917 Chibasai || 1991 NG || The Chiba Science Association, a non-profit astronomy organization in Chiba, Japan || 
|-id=919
| 5919 Patrickmartin ||  || Patrick Martin (born 1967), a research associate at Cornell University. || 
|-id=922
| 5922 Shouichi || 1992 UV || Shouichi Satō, Japanese electric engineer. || 
|-id=923
| 5923 Liedeke ||  || Liedeke Gehrels-de Stoppelaar, wife of astronomer Tom Gehrels † || 
|-id=924
| 5924 Teruo ||  || Teruo Saegusa, Japanese mountain climber || 
|-id=926
| 5926 Schönfeld || 1929 PB || Eduard Schönfeld (1828–1891), a German astronomer and director at the Mannheim and Bonn observatories who participated in the Bonner Durchmusterung || 
|-id=927
| 5927 Krogh || 1938 HA || Fred T. Krogh (born 1937), an American mathematician. || 
|-id=928
| 5928 Pindarus ||  || Pindar (c. 518–438 BC), Greek lyric poet || 
|-id=929
| 5929 Manzano || 1974 XT || José Roberto Manzano (1928–1999), Argentine astronomer and physicist || 
|-id=930
| 5930 Zhiganov ||  || Näcip Cihanov (Nazib Gayazovich Zhiganov; 1911–1988), a Soviet Tartar composer and founder of the Tatarian professional musical school || 
|-id=931
| 5931 Zhvanetskij ||  || Mikhail Zhvanetsky (born 1934), Russian writer, satirist and performer || 
|-id=932
| 5932 Prutkov ||  || Kozma Prutkov, a fictional author and the collective pen-name of several satirical Russian poets during the Russian Empire in the 1850s and 1860s || 
|-id=933
| 5933 Kemurdzhian || 1976 QN || Alexander Kemurdzhian (1921–2003), Soviet designer of Lunokhod moon rover || 
|-id=934
| 5934 Mats || 1976 SJ || Mats Lindgren, Swedish astronomer at Uppsala Astronomical Observatory || 
|-id=935
| 5935 Ostankino ||  || Ostankino, district of the city of Moscow in Russia || 
|-id=936
| 5936 Khadzhinov ||  || Leonid Petrovich Khadzhinov (born 1927), a Ukrainian electrical engineer || 
|-id=937
| 5937 Lodén || 1979 XQ || Kerstin Lodén and Lars Olof Lodén, Swedish astronomers at Stockholm Observatory || 
|-id=938
| 5938 Keller ||  || Horst Uwe Keller, German physicist at the Max Planck Institute in Lindau || 
|-id=939
| 5939 Toshimayeda ||  || Toshiko Mayeda, Japanese meteoriticist || 
|-id=940
| 5940 Feliksobolev ||  || Feliks Mikhailovich Sobolev (1931–1984), Ukrainian film producer || 
|-id=941
| 5941 Valencia ||  || Valencia, Spain || 
|-id=942
| 5942 Denzilrobert ||  || Denzil Marley (born 1918) and Robert Behymer (born 1926), fathers of the discoverers. || 
|-id=943
| 5943 Lovi || 1984 EG || George Lovi (1939–1993), Hungarian-born astronomical writer and cartographer || 
|-id=944
| 5944 Utesov ||  || Leonid Utyosov, Russian singer, musician, actor, founder and artistic leader of the first Russian theatricalized jazz band (on the occasion of the one-hundredth anniversary his birth) || 
|-id=945
| 5945 Roachapproach ||  || Steve Roach (born 1955), American musician and composer of 'space music' Src || 
|-id=946
| 5946 Hrozný ||  || Bedřich Hrozný, Czech archeologist, orientalist and linguist, decipherer of Hittite || 
|-id=947
| 5947 Bonnie || 1985 FD || Bonnie Gail Farquhar (1936–1993), late wife of American engineer Robert W. Farquhar, a spaceflight mission director at NASA || 
|-id=948
| 5948 Longo || 1985 JL || Giuseppe Longo (born 1920), Italian astronomer and physicist at the University of Bologna || 
|-id=950
| 5950 Leukippos ||  || Leucippus, Ancient Greek philosopher || 
|-id=951
| 5951 Alicemonet ||  || Alice Kay Monet (Alice Kay Babcock; born 1954), American astronomer at the United States Naval Observatory Flagstaff Station. She is married to David Monet (see below) || 
|-id=952
| 5952 Davemonet || 1987 EV || David Gilbert Monet (born 1951), American astronomer at the United States Naval Observatory Flagstaff Station and husband of Alice Monet (see above) || 
|-id=953
| 5953 Shelton || 1987 HS || Ian Shelton (born 1957), Canadian astronomer known for the discovery of the bright supernova SN 1987A || 
|-id=954
| 5954 Epikouros ||  || Epicurus, Ancient Greek philosopher || 
|-id=955
| 5955 Khromchenko ||  || Vladimir Anatolievich Khromchenko, a music teacher at Yalta and a talented designer who constructed the first home-built organ in Ukraine. || 
|-id=956
| 5956 d'Alembert ||  || Jean Le Rond d'Alembert, French philosopher and mathematician || 
|-id=957
| 5957 Irina || 1988 JN || Victorovna Farquhar, wife of American engineer Robert W. Farquhar, a spaceflight mission director at NASA || 
|-id=958
| 5958 Barrande ||  || Joachim Barrande, French palaeontologist || 
|-id=959
| 5959 Shaklan ||  || Stuart B. Shaklan, an optical engineer and instrumental for the NEAT program || 
|-id=960
| 5960 Wakkanai || 1989 US || Wakkanai, Hokkaidō, Japan || 
|-id=961
| 5961 Watt ||  || James Watt (1736–1819), a Scottish engineer whose improvements to the steam engine led to the rapid advances of the industrial revolution. || 
|-id=962
| 5962 Shikokutenkyo || 1990 HK || Shikoku Ten-mon Kyōkai, Japanese name for the Astronomical Society of Shikoku Island || 
|-id=966
| 5966 Tomeko ||  || Tomeko Goto (1899–?), wife of Seizo Goto, Japanese former president of Goto Optical Laboratory (see #969) || 
|-id=967
| 5967 Edithlevy ||  || Edith Pailet Levy (born 1918), American-Canadian geneticist, and mother of astronomer David H. Levy || 
|-id=968
| 5968 Trauger || 1991 FC || John T. Trauger, American physicist, Senior Research Scientist at the Jet Propulsion Laboratory, who was the principal investigator for the Wide Field/Planetary Camera II on the Hubble Space Telescope || 
|-id=969
| 5969 Ryuichiro || 1991 FT || Ryuichiro Goto (born 1938), Japanese current president of Goto Optical Laboratory || 
|-id=970
| 5970 Ohdohrikouen ||  || Odori Park, Sapporo, Japan || 
|-id=971
| 5971 Tickell ||  || Crispin Tickell (born 1930), British diplomat, who chaired the board of the Climate Institute of Washington (1990–2002) and the Government Panel on Sustainable Development (1994–2000), and who also served on the UK government's Task Force on Near-Earth Objects || 
|-id=972
| 5972 Harryatkinson ||  || Harry Atkinson (1929–2018), New Zealand-born British physicist, head of astronomy and space for the Science Research Council (1972–1978), chair of the European Space Agency Council (1984–1987), and chair of the UK Task Force on Near-Earth Objects in 2000 || 
|-id=973
| 5973 Takimoto || 1991 QC || Daisuke Takimoto, Japanese activist in the nuclear-power phase-out movement. || 
|-id=975
| 5975 Otakemayumi || 1992 SG || Mayumi Ōtake, music composer of Japanese planetarium || 
|-id=976
| 5976 Kalatajean ||  || Jean Marie Kalata, an American social science analyst at the Smithsonian Institution. Named on the occasion of the institution's sesquicentennial. || 
|-id=978
| 5978 Kaminokuni || 1992 WT || Kaminokuni, Hokkaidō, Japan || 
|-id=981
| 5981 Kresilas || 2140 P-L || Kresilas, Ancient Greek sculptor || 
|-id=982
| 5982 Polykletus || 4862 T-1 || Polykleitos (c. 480–423 BC), ancient Greek sculptor in bronze || 
|-id=983
| 5983 Praxiteles || 2285 T-2 || Praxiteles, Ancient Greek sculptor || 
|-id=984
| 5984 Lysippus || 4045 T-3 || Lysippos, Ancient Greek sculptor || 
|-id=986
| 5986 Xenophon || 1969 TA || Xenophon, the Athenian nobleman, pupil and interpreter of Socrates, historian, agriculturist, and military officer who lived from about 440 to 354 B.C. || 
|-id=987
| 5987 Liviogratton || 1975 LQ || Livio Gratton (1910–1991), Italo-Argentine astrophysicist, director of Astronomical Observatory of Córdoba and the first director of the Institute of Mathematics, Astronomy and Physics of the Córdoba National University || 
|-id=988
| 5988 Gorodnitskij ||  || Aleksandr Moiseevich Gorodnitskij (born 1933), Soviet geophysicist, oceanologist, and mineralogist, poet and songwriter || 
|-id=989
| 5989 Sorin ||  || Sergej Ivanovich Sorin (1916–1995), Soviet astronomer || 
|-id=990
| 5990 Panticapaeon || 1977 EO || Panticapæon or Panticapaeum, ancient Greek colony, now Kerch, Ukrainian seaport at the eastern extremity of the Crimean Peninsula || 
|-id=991
| 5991 Ivavladis ||  || Vladislav Ivanov (born 1936), Russian engineer || 
|-id=992
| 5992 Nittler || 1981 DZ || Larry Nittler (born 1969), American meteoriticist || 
|-id=993
| 5993 Tammydickinson ||  || Tamara Dickinson (born 1959), American meteoriticist || 
|-id=994
| 5994 Yakubovich ||  || Leonid Yakubovich (born 1945), Russian writer and television host || 
|-id=995
| 5995 Saint-Aignan || 1982 DK || Charles P. de Saint-Aignan (born 1977), American astronomer and software engineer who has discovered several minor planets || 
|-id=996
| 5996 Julioangel || 1983 NR || Julio Ángel Fernández (born 1946), Uruguayan astronomer || 
|-id=997
| 5997 Dirac || 1983 TH || Paul Dirac (1902–1984), British physicist and Nobelist || 
|-id=998
| 5998 Sitenský ||  || Ladislav Sitenský (1919–2009), Czech landscape photographer || 
|-id=999
| 5999 Plescia || 1987 HA || Jeffrey B. Plescia, American geophysicist and planetary geologist, researcher of terrestrial impact craters at the Jet Propulsion Laboratory || 
|-id=000
| 6000 United Nations || 1987 UN || The United Nations. The Asteroid was named by vote of IAU Commission 20 at its 1994 meeting in The Hague on the recommendation of the Minor Planet Names Committee. || 
|}

References 

005001-006000